

17001–17100 

|-bgcolor=#fefefe
| 17001 ||  || — || February 10, 1999 || Socorro || LINEAR || — || align=right | 4.1 km || 
|-id=002 bgcolor=#fefefe
| 17002 Kouzel ||  ||  || February 10, 1999 || Socorro || LINEAR || NYS || align=right | 2.1 km || 
|-id=003 bgcolor=#E9E9E9
| 17003 ||  || — || February 10, 1999 || Socorro || LINEAR || MAR || align=right | 4.9 km || 
|-id=004 bgcolor=#fefefe
| 17004 Sinkevich ||  ||  || February 12, 1999 || Socorro || LINEAR || — || align=right | 2.9 km || 
|-id=005 bgcolor=#E9E9E9
| 17005 ||  || — || February 12, 1999 || Socorro || LINEAR || GEF || align=right | 5.2 km || 
|-id=006 bgcolor=#E9E9E9
| 17006 ||  || — || February 12, 1999 || Socorro || LINEAR || — || align=right | 6.3 km || 
|-id=007 bgcolor=#fefefe
| 17007 ||  || — || February 12, 1999 || Socorro || LINEAR || — || align=right | 3.4 km || 
|-id=008 bgcolor=#d6d6d6
| 17008 ||  || — || February 12, 1999 || Socorro || LINEAR || TEL || align=right | 5.9 km || 
|-id=009 bgcolor=#E9E9E9
| 17009 ||  || — || February 12, 1999 || Socorro || LINEAR || — || align=right | 4.9 km || 
|-id=010 bgcolor=#E9E9E9
| 17010 ||  || — || February 12, 1999 || Socorro || LINEAR || — || align=right | 6.2 km || 
|-id=011 bgcolor=#d6d6d6
| 17011 ||  || — || February 12, 1999 || Socorro || LINEAR || — || align=right | 9.5 km || 
|-id=012 bgcolor=#E9E9E9
| 17012 ||  || — || February 12, 1999 || Socorro || LINEAR || EUN || align=right | 5.7 km || 
|-id=013 bgcolor=#fefefe
| 17013 ||  || — || February 12, 1999 || Socorro || LINEAR || — || align=right | 9.3 km || 
|-id=014 bgcolor=#E9E9E9
| 17014 ||  || — || February 10, 1999 || Socorro || LINEAR || — || align=right | 4.2 km || 
|-id=015 bgcolor=#fefefe
| 17015 ||  || — || February 12, 1999 || Socorro || LINEAR || FLO || align=right | 3.9 km || 
|-id=016 bgcolor=#E9E9E9
| 17016 ||  || — || February 11, 1999 || Socorro || LINEAR || EUN || align=right | 6.7 km || 
|-id=017 bgcolor=#fefefe
| 17017 ||  || — || February 11, 1999 || Kitt Peak || Spacewatch || — || align=right | 2.7 km || 
|-id=018 bgcolor=#fefefe
| 17018 ||  || — || February 18, 1999 || Haleakala || NEAT || — || align=right | 2.9 km || 
|-id=019 bgcolor=#E9E9E9
| 17019 Aldo ||  ||  || February 23, 1999 || Montelupo || M. Tombelli, G. Forti || — || align=right | 7.1 km || 
|-id=020 bgcolor=#E9E9E9
| 17020 Hopemeraengus ||  ||  || February 24, 1999 || Cocoa || I. P. Griffin || — || align=right | 11 km || 
|-id=021 bgcolor=#E9E9E9
| 17021 ||  || — || February 20, 1999 || Socorro || LINEAR || — || align=right | 12 km || 
|-id=022 bgcolor=#fefefe
| 17022 Huisjen ||  ||  || February 18, 1999 || Anderson Mesa || LONEOS || NYS || align=right | 8.4 km || 
|-id=023 bgcolor=#fefefe
| 17023 Abbott || 1999 EG ||  || March 7, 1999 || Reedy Creek || J. Broughton || NYS || align=right | 2.8 km || 
|-id=024 bgcolor=#fefefe
| 17024 Costello ||  ||  || March 15, 1999 || Reedy Creek || J. Broughton || — || align=right | 3.7 km || 
|-id=025 bgcolor=#E9E9E9
| 17025 Pilachowski ||  ||  || March 13, 1999 || Goodricke-Pigott || R. A. Tucker || RAF || align=right | 4.0 km || 
|-id=026 bgcolor=#E9E9E9
| 17026 ||  || — || March 12, 1999 || Kitt Peak || Spacewatch || — || align=right | 4.3 km || 
|-id=027 bgcolor=#E9E9E9
| 17027 ||  || — || March 15, 1999 || Socorro || LINEAR || — || align=right | 9.8 km || 
|-id=028 bgcolor=#fefefe
| 17028 ||  || — || March 18, 1999 || Kitt Peak || Spacewatch || FLO || align=right | 2.0 km || 
|-id=029 bgcolor=#d6d6d6
| 17029 Cuillandre ||  ||  || March 17, 1999 || Caussols || ODAS || KOR || align=right | 6.5 km || 
|-id=030 bgcolor=#d6d6d6
| 17030 Sierks ||  ||  || March 19, 1999 || Anderson Mesa || LONEOS || slow || align=right | 12 km || 
|-id=031 bgcolor=#fefefe
| 17031 Piethut ||  ||  || March 22, 1999 || Anderson Mesa || LONEOS || V || align=right | 4.6 km || 
|-id=032 bgcolor=#E9E9E9
| 17032 Edlu ||  ||  || March 22, 1999 || Anderson Mesa || LONEOS || — || align=right | 8.3 km || 
|-id=033 bgcolor=#fefefe
| 17033 Rusty ||  ||  || March 22, 1999 || Anderson Mesa || LONEOS || — || align=right | 2.5 km || 
|-id=034 bgcolor=#E9E9E9
| 17034 Vasylshev ||  ||  || March 22, 1999 || Anderson Mesa || LONEOS || — || align=right | 6.6 km || 
|-id=035 bgcolor=#fefefe
| 17035 Velichko ||  ||  || March 22, 1999 || Anderson Mesa || LONEOS || V || align=right | 4.8 km || 
|-id=036 bgcolor=#E9E9E9
| 17036 Krugly ||  ||  || March 22, 1999 || Anderson Mesa || LONEOS || — || align=right | 2.9 km || 
|-id=037 bgcolor=#fefefe
| 17037 ||  || — || March 16, 1999 || Kitt Peak || Spacewatch || — || align=right | 3.8 km || 
|-id=038 bgcolor=#E9E9E9
| 17038 Wake ||  ||  || March 26, 1999 || Reedy Creek || J. Broughton || — || align=right | 4.1 km || 
|-id=039 bgcolor=#E9E9E9
| 17039 Yeuseyenka ||  ||  || March 19, 1999 || Socorro || LINEAR || — || align=right | 10 km || 
|-id=040 bgcolor=#fefefe
| 17040 Almeida ||  ||  || March 19, 1999 || Socorro || LINEAR || — || align=right | 7.8 km || 
|-id=041 bgcolor=#fefefe
| 17041 Castagna ||  ||  || March 19, 1999 || Socorro || LINEAR || FLO || align=right | 2.0 km || 
|-id=042 bgcolor=#fefefe
| 17042 Madiraju ||  ||  || March 19, 1999 || Socorro || LINEAR || — || align=right | 6.4 km || 
|-id=043 bgcolor=#fefefe
| 17043 ||  || — || March 19, 1999 || Socorro || LINEAR || — || align=right | 3.7 km || 
|-id=044 bgcolor=#fefefe
| 17044 Mubdirahman ||  ||  || March 19, 1999 || Socorro || LINEAR || — || align=right | 3.4 km || 
|-id=045 bgcolor=#fefefe
| 17045 Markert ||  ||  || March 22, 1999 || Mauna Kea || D. J. Tholen || — || align=right | 2.9 km || 
|-id=046 bgcolor=#d6d6d6
| 17046 Kenway ||  ||  || March 19, 1999 || Socorro || LINEAR || — || align=right | 7.7 km || 
|-id=047 bgcolor=#d6d6d6
| 17047 ||  || — || March 19, 1999 || Socorro || LINEAR || — || align=right | 5.9 km || 
|-id=048 bgcolor=#fefefe
| 17048 ||  || — || March 19, 1999 || Socorro || LINEAR || — || align=right | 3.1 km || 
|-id=049 bgcolor=#E9E9E9
| 17049 Miron ||  ||  || March 19, 1999 || Socorro || LINEAR || — || align=right | 3.7 km || 
|-id=050 bgcolor=#fefefe
| 17050 Weiskopf ||  ||  || March 20, 1999 || Socorro || LINEAR || — || align=right | 3.1 km || 
|-id=051 bgcolor=#fefefe
| 17051 Oflynn ||  ||  || March 20, 1999 || Socorro || LINEAR || V || align=right | 3.8 km || 
|-id=052 bgcolor=#E9E9E9
| 17052 ||  || — || March 20, 1999 || Socorro || LINEAR || — || align=right | 7.3 km || 
|-id=053 bgcolor=#d6d6d6
| 17053 ||  || — || March 20, 1999 || Socorro || LINEAR || KOR || align=right | 6.1 km || 
|-id=054 bgcolor=#d6d6d6
| 17054 ||  || — || April 6, 1999 || Višnjan Observatory || K. Korlević || KOR || align=right | 6.8 km || 
|-id=055 bgcolor=#E9E9E9
| 17055 ||  || — || April 6, 1999 || King City, Ontario Observatory || R. G. Sandness || MAR || align=right | 3.7 km || 
|-id=056 bgcolor=#fefefe
| 17056 Boschetti ||  ||  || April 6, 1999 || San Marcello || L. Tesi, A. Boattini || — || align=right | 2.9 km || 
|-id=057 bgcolor=#fefefe
| 17057 ||  || — || April 10, 1999 || Višnjan Observatory || K. Korlević || FLO || align=right | 4.5 km || 
|-id=058 bgcolor=#E9E9E9
| 17058 Rocknroll ||  ||  || April 13, 1999 || Reedy Creek || J. Broughton || MAR || align=right | 5.5 km || 
|-id=059 bgcolor=#fefefe
| 17059 Elvis ||  ||  || April 15, 1999 || Reedy Creek || J. Broughton || — || align=right | 4.0 km || 
|-id=060 bgcolor=#E9E9E9
| 17060 Mikecombi ||  ||  || April 9, 1999 || Anderson Mesa || LONEOS || EUN || align=right | 5.2 km || 
|-id=061 bgcolor=#E9E9E9
| 17061 Tegler ||  ||  || April 10, 1999 || Anderson Mesa || LONEOS || — || align=right | 3.4 km || 
|-id=062 bgcolor=#d6d6d6
| 17062 Bardot ||  ||  || April 10, 1999 || Anderson Mesa || LONEOS || — || align=right | 11 km || 
|-id=063 bgcolor=#fefefe
| 17063 Papaloizou ||  ||  || April 15, 1999 || Anderson Mesa || LONEOS || — || align=right | 4.5 km || 
|-id=064 bgcolor=#fefefe
| 17064 ||  || — || April 15, 1999 || Socorro || LINEAR || V || align=right | 3.8 km || 
|-id=065 bgcolor=#fefefe
| 17065 ||  || — || April 15, 1999 || Socorro || LINEAR || — || align=right | 7.4 km || 
|-id=066 bgcolor=#E9E9E9
| 17066 Ginagallant ||  ||  || April 15, 1999 || Socorro || LINEAR || — || align=right | 4.2 km || 
|-id=067 bgcolor=#d6d6d6
| 17067 ||  || — || April 15, 1999 || Socorro || LINEAR || EOS || align=right | 6.3 km || 
|-id=068 bgcolor=#E9E9E9
| 17068 ||  || — || April 15, 1999 || Socorro || LINEAR || WIT || align=right | 6.7 km || 
|-id=069 bgcolor=#fefefe
| 17069 ||  || — || April 15, 1999 || Socorro || LINEAR || — || align=right | 4.5 km || 
|-id=070 bgcolor=#E9E9E9
| 17070 ||  || — || April 15, 1999 || Socorro || LINEAR || — || align=right | 5.1 km || 
|-id=071 bgcolor=#fefefe
| 17071 ||  || — || April 15, 1999 || Socorro || LINEAR || — || align=right | 4.3 km || 
|-id=072 bgcolor=#fefefe
| 17072 Athiviraham ||  ||  || April 7, 1999 || Socorro || LINEAR || V || align=right | 1.9 km || 
|-id=073 bgcolor=#d6d6d6
| 17073 Alexblank ||  ||  || April 6, 1999 || Socorro || LINEAR || — || align=right | 4.7 km || 
|-id=074 bgcolor=#E9E9E9
| 17074 ||  || — || April 12, 1999 || Socorro || LINEAR || — || align=right | 4.7 km || 
|-id=075 bgcolor=#fefefe
| 17075 Pankonin ||  ||  || April 9, 1999 || Anderson Mesa || LONEOS || FLO || align=right | 3.2 km || 
|-id=076 bgcolor=#fefefe
| 17076 Betti || 1999 HO ||  || April 18, 1999 || Prescott || P. G. Comba || V || align=right | 2.4 km || 
|-id=077 bgcolor=#fefefe
| 17077 Pampaloni ||  ||  || April 25, 1999 || San Marcello || A. Boattini, M. Tombelli || — || align=right | 4.0 km || 
|-id=078 bgcolor=#d6d6d6
| 17078 Sellers ||  ||  || April 24, 1999 || Reedy Creek || J. Broughton || — || align=right | 10 km || 
|-id=079 bgcolor=#fefefe
| 17079 Lavrovsky ||  ||  || April 17, 1999 || Socorro || LINEAR || V || align=right | 2.8 km || 
|-id=080 bgcolor=#d6d6d6
| 17080 ||  || — || April 17, 1999 || Socorro || LINEAR || EOS || align=right | 7.2 km || 
|-id=081 bgcolor=#fefefe
| 17081 Jaytee ||  ||  || May 8, 1999 || Catalina || CSS || moon || align=right | 4.5 km || 
|-id=082 bgcolor=#d6d6d6
| 17082 ||  || — || May 9, 1999 || Višnjan Observatory || K. Korlević || KOR || align=right | 7.2 km || 
|-id=083 bgcolor=#fefefe
| 17083 ||  || — || May 10, 1999 || Socorro || LINEAR || H || align=right | 1.7 km || 
|-id=084 bgcolor=#d6d6d6
| 17084 ||  || — || May 10, 1999 || Socorro || LINEAR || — || align=right | 6.2 km || 
|-id=085 bgcolor=#fefefe
| 17085 ||  || — || May 15, 1999 || Kitt Peak || Spacewatch || V || align=right | 2.5 km || 
|-id=086 bgcolor=#fefefe
| 17086 Ruima ||  ||  || May 10, 1999 || Socorro || LINEAR || NYS || align=right | 3.5 km || 
|-id=087 bgcolor=#d6d6d6
| 17087 ||  || — || May 10, 1999 || Socorro || LINEAR || HYG || align=right | 12 km || 
|-id=088 bgcolor=#E9E9E9
| 17088 Giupalazzolo ||  ||  || May 10, 1999 || Socorro || LINEAR || — || align=right | 3.0 km || 
|-id=089 bgcolor=#E9E9E9
| 17089 Mercado ||  ||  || May 10, 1999 || Socorro || LINEAR || — || align=right | 3.6 km || 
|-id=090 bgcolor=#fefefe
| 17090 Mundaca ||  ||  || May 10, 1999 || Socorro || LINEAR || NYS || align=right | 3.3 km || 
|-id=091 bgcolor=#E9E9E9
| 17091 Senthalir ||  ||  || May 10, 1999 || Socorro || LINEAR || slow? || align=right | 5.6 km || 
|-id=092 bgcolor=#fefefe
| 17092 Sharanya ||  ||  || May 10, 1999 || Socorro || LINEAR || V || align=right | 3.1 km || 
|-id=093 bgcolor=#E9E9E9
| 17093 ||  || — || May 10, 1999 || Socorro || LINEAR || — || align=right | 4.5 km || 
|-id=094 bgcolor=#d6d6d6
| 17094 ||  || — || May 10, 1999 || Socorro || LINEAR || — || align=right | 5.3 km || 
|-id=095 bgcolor=#fefefe
| 17095 Mahadik ||  ||  || May 10, 1999 || Socorro || LINEAR || — || align=right | 8.7 km || 
|-id=096 bgcolor=#d6d6d6
| 17096 ||  || — || May 10, 1999 || Socorro || LINEAR || KOR || align=right | 5.6 km || 
|-id=097 bgcolor=#d6d6d6
| 17097 Ronneuman ||  ||  || May 10, 1999 || Socorro || LINEAR || THM || align=right | 8.0 km || 
|-id=098 bgcolor=#E9E9E9
| 17098 Ikedamai ||  ||  || May 10, 1999 || Socorro || LINEAR || — || align=right | 3.8 km || 
|-id=099 bgcolor=#E9E9E9
| 17099 ||  || — || May 10, 1999 || Socorro || LINEAR || — || align=right | 5.1 km || 
|-id=100 bgcolor=#E9E9E9
| 17100 Kamiokanatsu ||  ||  || May 10, 1999 || Socorro || LINEAR || — || align=right | 11 km || 
|}

17101–17200 

|-bgcolor=#fefefe
| 17101 Sakenova ||  ||  || May 10, 1999 || Socorro || LINEAR || — || align=right | 3.2 km || 
|-id=102 bgcolor=#fefefe
| 17102 Begzhigitova ||  ||  || May 10, 1999 || Socorro || LINEAR || FLO || align=right | 2.2 km || 
|-id=103 bgcolor=#d6d6d6
| 17103 Kadyrsizova ||  ||  || May 10, 1999 || Socorro || LINEAR || KOR || align=right | 4.9 km || 
|-id=104 bgcolor=#d6d6d6
| 17104 McCloskey ||  ||  || May 10, 1999 || Socorro || LINEAR || THM || align=right | 7.4 km || 
|-id=105 bgcolor=#E9E9E9
| 17105 ||  || — || May 10, 1999 || Socorro || LINEAR || — || align=right | 6.4 km || 
|-id=106 bgcolor=#E9E9E9
| 17106 ||  || — || May 10, 1999 || Socorro || LINEAR || AGN || align=right | 13 km || 
|-id=107 bgcolor=#d6d6d6
| 17107 ||  || — || May 10, 1999 || Socorro || LINEAR || KOR || align=right | 7.2 km || 
|-id=108 bgcolor=#d6d6d6
| 17108 Patricorbett ||  ||  || May 10, 1999 || Socorro || LINEAR || KOR || align=right | 3.6 km || 
|-id=109 bgcolor=#E9E9E9
| 17109 ||  || — || May 10, 1999 || Socorro || LINEAR || GEF || align=right | 27 km || 
|-id=110 bgcolor=#d6d6d6
| 17110 ||  || — || May 10, 1999 || Socorro || LINEAR || EOS || align=right | 7.5 km || 
|-id=111 bgcolor=#d6d6d6
| 17111 ||  || — || May 10, 1999 || Socorro || LINEAR || EOS || align=right | 13 km || 
|-id=112 bgcolor=#E9E9E9
| 17112 ||  || — || May 10, 1999 || Socorro || LINEAR || GEF || align=right | 7.2 km || 
|-id=113 bgcolor=#d6d6d6
| 17113 ||  || — || May 10, 1999 || Socorro || LINEAR || — || align=right | 9.1 km || 
|-id=114 bgcolor=#d6d6d6
| 17114 ||  || — || May 10, 1999 || Socorro || LINEAR || — || align=right | 10 km || 
|-id=115 bgcolor=#d6d6d6
| 17115 Justiniano ||  ||  || May 10, 1999 || Socorro || LINEAR || KOR || align=right | 4.0 km || 
|-id=116 bgcolor=#d6d6d6
| 17116 ||  || — || May 10, 1999 || Socorro || LINEAR || KOR || align=right | 6.8 km || 
|-id=117 bgcolor=#d6d6d6
| 17117 ||  || — || May 10, 1999 || Socorro || LINEAR || HYG || align=right | 15 km || 
|-id=118 bgcolor=#d6d6d6
| 17118 ||  || — || May 10, 1999 || Socorro || LINEAR || — || align=right | 8.9 km || 
|-id=119 bgcolor=#E9E9E9
| 17119 Alexisrodrz ||  ||  || May 10, 1999 || Socorro || LINEAR || — || align=right | 3.9 km || 
|-id=120 bgcolor=#d6d6d6
| 17120 ||  || — || May 10, 1999 || Socorro || LINEAR || KOR || align=right | 6.8 km || 
|-id=121 bgcolor=#E9E9E9
| 17121 Fernandonido ||  ||  || May 10, 1999 || Socorro || LINEAR || — || align=right | 5.3 km || 
|-id=122 bgcolor=#d6d6d6
| 17122 ||  || — || May 10, 1999 || Socorro || LINEAR || KORslow? || align=right | 7.4 km || 
|-id=123 bgcolor=#d6d6d6
| 17123 ||  || — || May 10, 1999 || Socorro || LINEAR || EOS || align=right | 6.3 km || 
|-id=124 bgcolor=#E9E9E9
| 17124 ||  || — || May 12, 1999 || Socorro || LINEAR || — || align=right | 4.3 km || 
|-id=125 bgcolor=#E9E9E9
| 17125 ||  || — || May 12, 1999 || Socorro || LINEAR || PAD || align=right | 7.4 km || 
|-id=126 bgcolor=#E9E9E9
| 17126 ||  || — || May 12, 1999 || Socorro || LINEAR || NEM || align=right | 7.1 km || 
|-id=127 bgcolor=#E9E9E9
| 17127 ||  || — || May 12, 1999 || Socorro || LINEAR || slow || align=right | 4.7 km || 
|-id=128 bgcolor=#E9E9E9
| 17128 ||  || — || May 10, 1999 || Socorro || LINEAR || — || align=right | 5.6 km || 
|-id=129 bgcolor=#E9E9E9
| 17129 ||  || — || May 13, 1999 || Socorro || LINEAR || — || align=right | 12 km || 
|-id=130 bgcolor=#fefefe
| 17130 ||  || — || May 13, 1999 || Socorro || LINEAR || FLO || align=right | 3.9 km || 
|-id=131 bgcolor=#d6d6d6
| 17131 ||  || — || May 12, 1999 || Socorro || LINEAR || EOS || align=right | 4.7 km || 
|-id=132 bgcolor=#E9E9E9
| 17132 ||  || — || May 12, 1999 || Socorro || LINEAR || — || align=right | 12 km || 
|-id=133 bgcolor=#E9E9E9
| 17133 ||  || — || May 12, 1999 || Socorro || LINEAR || EUN || align=right | 7.7 km || 
|-id=134 bgcolor=#d6d6d6
| 17134 ||  || — || May 12, 1999 || Socorro || LINEAR || — || align=right | 7.6 km || 
|-id=135 bgcolor=#d6d6d6
| 17135 ||  || — || May 12, 1999 || Socorro || LINEAR || — || align=right | 9.3 km || 
|-id=136 bgcolor=#E9E9E9
| 17136 ||  || — || May 12, 1999 || Socorro || LINEAR || — || align=right | 9.9 km || 
|-id=137 bgcolor=#d6d6d6
| 17137 ||  || — || May 12, 1999 || Socorro || LINEAR || URS || align=right | 15 km || 
|-id=138 bgcolor=#E9E9E9
| 17138 ||  || — || May 12, 1999 || Socorro || LINEAR || — || align=right | 6.0 km || 
|-id=139 bgcolor=#fefefe
| 17139 Malyshev ||  ||  || May 12, 1999 || Socorro || LINEAR || V || align=right | 3.2 km || 
|-id=140 bgcolor=#fefefe
| 17140 ||  || — || May 12, 1999 || Socorro || LINEAR || — || align=right | 2.9 km || 
|-id=141 bgcolor=#E9E9E9
| 17141 ||  || — || May 12, 1999 || Socorro || LINEAR || MAR || align=right | 5.1 km || 
|-id=142 bgcolor=#E9E9E9
| 17142 ||  || — || May 12, 1999 || Socorro || LINEAR || — || align=right | 4.5 km || 
|-id=143 bgcolor=#d6d6d6
| 17143 ||  || — || May 12, 1999 || Socorro || LINEAR || EOS || align=right | 6.3 km || 
|-id=144 bgcolor=#d6d6d6
| 17144 ||  || — || May 12, 1999 || Socorro || LINEAR || — || align=right | 5.9 km || 
|-id=145 bgcolor=#E9E9E9
| 17145 ||  || — || May 12, 1999 || Socorro || LINEAR || — || align=right | 6.4 km || 
|-id=146 bgcolor=#d6d6d6
| 17146 ||  || — || May 13, 1999 || Socorro || LINEAR || — || align=right | 11 km || 
|-id=147 bgcolor=#d6d6d6
| 17147 ||  || — || May 13, 1999 || Socorro || LINEAR || KOR || align=right | 5.4 km || 
|-id=148 bgcolor=#d6d6d6
| 17148 ||  || — || May 12, 1999 || Socorro || LINEAR || — || align=right | 4.8 km || 
|-id=149 bgcolor=#E9E9E9
| 17149 ||  || — || May 13, 1999 || Socorro || LINEAR || AGNslow || align=right | 4.9 km || 
|-id=150 bgcolor=#d6d6d6
| 17150 ||  || — || May 13, 1999 || Socorro || LINEAR || THM || align=right | 11 km || 
|-id=151 bgcolor=#d6d6d6
| 17151 ||  || — || May 13, 1999 || Socorro || LINEAR || KOR || align=right | 4.6 km || 
|-id=152 bgcolor=#fefefe
| 17152 ||  || — || May 13, 1999 || Socorro || LINEAR || — || align=right | 8.3 km || 
|-id=153 bgcolor=#d6d6d6
| 17153 ||  || — || May 13, 1999 || Socorro || LINEAR || — || align=right | 10 km || 
|-id=154 bgcolor=#d6d6d6
| 17154 ||  || — || May 13, 1999 || Socorro || LINEAR || EOS || align=right | 10 km || 
|-id=155 bgcolor=#d6d6d6
| 17155 ||  || — || May 16, 1999 || Kitt Peak || Spacewatch || — || align=right | 6.8 km || 
|-id=156 bgcolor=#d6d6d6
| 17156 Kennethseitz ||  ||  || May 19, 1999 || Kitt Peak || Spacewatch || — || align=right | 16 km || 
|-id=157 bgcolor=#E9E9E9
| 17157 ||  || — || May 21, 1999 || Xinglong || SCAP || MAR || align=right | 6.4 km || 
|-id=158 bgcolor=#d6d6d6
| 17158 ||  || — || May 18, 1999 || Socorro || LINEAR || EOS || align=right | 7.4 km || 
|-id=159 bgcolor=#d6d6d6
| 17159 ||  || — || May 18, 1999 || Socorro || LINEAR || TEL || align=right | 7.2 km || 
|-id=160 bgcolor=#d6d6d6
| 17160 ||  || — || June 8, 1999 || Socorro || LINEAR || — || align=right | 5.9 km || 
|-id=161 bgcolor=#d6d6d6
| 17161 ||  || — || June 9, 1999 || Socorro || LINEAR || 7:4 || align=right | 16 km || 
|-id=162 bgcolor=#fefefe
| 17162 ||  || — || June 9, 1999 || Socorro || LINEAR || V || align=right | 5.0 km || 
|-id=163 bgcolor=#d6d6d6
| 17163 Vasifedoseev ||  ||  || June 9, 1999 || Socorro || LINEAR || KOR || align=right | 4.9 km || 
|-id=164 bgcolor=#d6d6d6
| 17164 ||  || — || June 9, 1999 || Socorro || LINEAR || — || align=right | 18 km || 
|-id=165 bgcolor=#d6d6d6
| 17165 ||  || — || June 9, 1999 || Socorro || LINEAR || — || align=right | 12 km || 
|-id=166 bgcolor=#d6d6d6
| 17166 Secombe || 1999 MC ||  || June 17, 1999 || Reedy Creek || J. Broughton || — || align=right | 11 km || 
|-id=167 bgcolor=#fefefe
| 17167 Olgarozanova || 1999 NB ||  || July 4, 1999 || Kleť || J. Tichá, M. Tichý || NYS || align=right | 10 km || 
|-id=168 bgcolor=#E9E9E9
| 17168 ||  || — || July 13, 1999 || Socorro || LINEAR || — || align=right | 6.7 km || 
|-id=169 bgcolor=#d6d6d6
| 17169 Tatarinov ||  ||  || July 14, 1999 || Socorro || LINEAR || — || align=right | 9.7 km || 
|-id=170 bgcolor=#fefefe
| 17170 Vsevustinov ||  ||  || July 14, 1999 || Socorro || LINEAR || FLO || align=right | 3.9 km || 
|-id=171 bgcolor=#C2FFFF
| 17171 ||  || — || July 14, 1999 || Socorro || LINEAR || L5 || align=right | 41 km || 
|-id=172 bgcolor=#C2FFFF
| 17172 ||  || — || July 14, 1999 || Socorro || LINEAR || L5 || align=right | 34 km || 
|-id=173 bgcolor=#fefefe
| 17173 Evgenyamosov ||  ||  || September 7, 1999 || Socorro || LINEAR || MAS || align=right | 3.6 km || 
|-id=174 bgcolor=#E9E9E9
| 17174 ||  || — || September 7, 1999 || Socorro || LINEAR || — || align=right | 4.9 km || 
|-id=175 bgcolor=#d6d6d6
| 17175 ||  || — || September 24, 1999 || Socorro || LINEAR || ALA || align=right | 18 km || 
|-id=176 bgcolor=#fefefe
| 17176 Viktorov ||  ||  || September 30, 1999 || Socorro || LINEAR || — || align=right | 3.7 km || 
|-id=177 bgcolor=#d6d6d6
| 17177 ||  || — || October 8, 1999 || Catalina || CSS || ALA || align=right | 11 km || 
|-id=178 bgcolor=#d6d6d6
| 17178 ||  || — || October 15, 1999 || Socorro || LINEAR || — || align=right | 8.6 km || 
|-id=179 bgcolor=#d6d6d6
| 17179 Codina ||  ||  || October 4, 1999 || Anderson Mesa || LONEOS || — || align=right | 12 km || 
|-id=180 bgcolor=#E9E9E9
| 17180 ||  || — || October 10, 1999 || Socorro || LINEAR || EUN || align=right | 5.0 km || 
|-id=181 bgcolor=#FFC2E0
| 17181 ||  || — || October 19, 1999 || Socorro || LINEAR || APO +1km || align=right | 1.7 km || 
|-id=182 bgcolor=#FFC2E0
| 17182 || 1999 VU || — || November 1, 1999 || Socorro || LINEAR || APO +1km || align=right | 2.9 km || 
|-id=183 bgcolor=#E9E9E9
| 17183 ||  || — || November 5, 1999 || Catalina || CSS || — || align=right | 10 km || 
|-id=184 bgcolor=#d6d6d6
| 17184 Carlrogers ||  ||  || November 13, 1999 || Fountain Hills || C. W. Juels || EOS || align=right | 12 km || 
|-id=185 bgcolor=#E9E9E9
| 17185 Mcdavid ||  ||  || November 14, 1999 || Fountain Hills || C. W. Juels || — || align=right | 5.5 km || 
|-id=186 bgcolor=#fefefe
| 17186 Sergivanov ||  ||  || November 3, 1999 || Socorro || LINEAR || NYS || align=right | 2.1 km || 
|-id=187 bgcolor=#fefefe
| 17187 ||  || — || November 14, 1999 || Xinglong || SCAP || — || align=right | 4.9 km || 
|-id=188 bgcolor=#FFC2E0
| 17188 ||  || — || November 17, 1999 || Socorro || LINEAR || APO +1km || align=right | 1.8 km || 
|-id=189 bgcolor=#fefefe
| 17189 ||  || — || November 28, 1999 || Oizumi || T. Kobayashi || — || align=right | 4.5 km || 
|-id=190 bgcolor=#E9E9E9
| 17190 Retopezzoli ||  ||  || November 28, 1999 || Gnosca || S. Sposetti || — || align=right | 5.1 km || 
|-id=191 bgcolor=#E9E9E9
| 17191 ||  || — || December 4, 1999 || Catalina || CSS || — || align=right | 2.7 km || 
|-id=192 bgcolor=#E9E9E9
| 17192 Loharu ||  ||  || December 10, 1999 || Socorro || LINEAR || — || align=right | 3.9 km || 
|-id=193 bgcolor=#fefefe
| 17193 Alexeybaran ||  ||  || December 12, 1999 || Socorro || LINEAR || — || align=right | 3.0 km || 
|-id=194 bgcolor=#E9E9E9
| 17194 ||  || — || December 14, 1999 || Socorro || LINEAR || — || align=right | 6.7 km || 
|-id=195 bgcolor=#d6d6d6
| 17195 Jimrichardson ||  ||  || December 3, 1999 || Anderson Mesa || LONEOS || — || align=right | 6.2 km || 
|-id=196 bgcolor=#E9E9E9
| 17196 Mastrodemos ||  ||  || December 3, 1999 || Anderson Mesa || LONEOS || — || align=right | 7.1 km || 
|-id=197 bgcolor=#fefefe
| 17197 Matjazbone ||  ||  || January 3, 2000 || Socorro || LINEAR || — || align=right | 3.7 km || 
|-id=198 bgcolor=#fefefe
| 17198 Gorjup ||  ||  || January 3, 2000 || Socorro || LINEAR || — || align=right | 2.9 km || 
|-id=199 bgcolor=#d6d6d6
| 17199 ||  || — || January 3, 2000 || Socorro || LINEAR || EOS || align=right | 7.3 km || 
|-id=200 bgcolor=#E9E9E9
| 17200 ||  || — || January 4, 2000 || Socorro || LINEAR || — || align=right | 3.3 km || 
|}

17201–17300 

|-bgcolor=#d6d6d6
| 17201 Matjazhumar ||  ||  || January 4, 2000 || Socorro || LINEAR || — || align=right | 6.5 km || 
|-id=202 bgcolor=#E9E9E9
| 17202 ||  || — || January 4, 2000 || Socorro || LINEAR || GEF || align=right | 5.9 km || 
|-id=203 bgcolor=#d6d6d6
| 17203 ||  || — || January 4, 2000 || Socorro || LINEAR || — || align=right | 12 km || 
|-id=204 bgcolor=#E9E9E9
| 17204 ||  || — || January 5, 2000 || Socorro || LINEAR || — || align=right | 3.2 km || 
|-id=205 bgcolor=#E9E9E9
| 17205 ||  || — || January 5, 2000 || Socorro || LINEAR || — || align=right | 3.4 km || 
|-id=206 bgcolor=#d6d6d6
| 17206 ||  || — || January 5, 2000 || Socorro || LINEAR || — || align=right | 14 km || 
|-id=207 bgcolor=#E9E9E9
| 17207 ||  || — || January 5, 2000 || Socorro || LINEAR || — || align=right | 7.2 km || 
|-id=208 bgcolor=#E9E9E9
| 17208 Pokrovska ||  ||  || January 5, 2000 || Socorro || LINEAR || — || align=right | 3.1 km || 
|-id=209 bgcolor=#E9E9E9
| 17209 ||  || — || January 5, 2000 || Socorro || LINEAR || EUN || align=right | 7.0 km || 
|-id=210 bgcolor=#d6d6d6
| 17210 ||  || — || January 7, 2000 || Socorro || LINEAR || — || align=right | 11 km || 
|-id=211 bgcolor=#fefefe
| 17211 Brianfisher ||  ||  || January 7, 2000 || Socorro || LINEAR || V || align=right | 2.3 km || 
|-id=212 bgcolor=#d6d6d6
| 17212 ||  || — || January 7, 2000 || Socorro || LINEAR || HIL3:2 || align=right | 14 km || 
|-id=213 bgcolor=#d6d6d6
| 17213 ||  || — || January 8, 2000 || Socorro || LINEAR || — || align=right | 16 km || 
|-id=214 bgcolor=#fefefe
| 17214 ||  || — || January 8, 2000 || Socorro || LINEAR || — || align=right | 4.0 km || 
|-id=215 bgcolor=#fefefe
| 17215 Slivan ||  ||  || January 6, 2000 || Anderson Mesa || LONEOS || FLO || align=right | 2.3 km || 
|-id=216 bgcolor=#d6d6d6
| 17216 Scottstuart ||  ||  || January 7, 2000 || Anderson Mesa || LONEOS || — || align=right | 14 km || 
|-id=217 bgcolor=#E9E9E9
| 17217 ||  || — || January 7, 2000 || Socorro || LINEAR || — || align=right | 3.7 km || 
|-id=218 bgcolor=#E9E9E9
| 17218 ||  || — || January 30, 2000 || Socorro || LINEAR || MIS || align=right | 8.6 km || 
|-id=219 bgcolor=#E9E9E9
| 17219 Gianninoto || 2000 CV ||  || February 1, 2000 || Catalina || CSS || EUN || align=right | 6.1 km || 
|-id=220 bgcolor=#fefefe
| 17220 Johnpenna ||  ||  || February 2, 2000 || Socorro || LINEAR || FLO || align=right | 5.7 km || 
|-id=221 bgcolor=#d6d6d6
| 17221 ||  || — || February 2, 2000 || Socorro || LINEAR || — || align=right | 7.7 km || 
|-id=222 bgcolor=#E9E9E9
| 17222 Perlmutter ||  ||  || February 2, 2000 || Socorro || LINEAR || — || align=right | 2.8 km || 
|-id=223 bgcolor=#E9E9E9
| 17223 ||  || — || February 5, 2000 || Socorro || LINEAR || MAR || align=right | 5.9 km || 
|-id=224 bgcolor=#fefefe
| 17224 Randoross ||  ||  || February 5, 2000 || Socorro || LINEAR || — || align=right | 4.5 km || 
|-id=225 bgcolor=#fefefe
| 17225 Alanschorn ||  ||  || February 2, 2000 || Socorro || LINEAR || V || align=right | 4.2 km || 
|-id=226 bgcolor=#fefefe
| 17226 ||  || — || February 8, 2000 || Socorro || LINEAR || — || align=right | 5.4 km || 
|-id=227 bgcolor=#E9E9E9
| 17227 ||  || — || February 11, 2000 || Tebbutt || F. B. Zoltowski || HOF || align=right | 7.4 km || 
|-id=228 bgcolor=#d6d6d6
| 17228 ||  || — || February 8, 2000 || Socorro || LINEAR || — || align=right | 8.9 km || 
|-id=229 bgcolor=#fefefe
| 17229 ||  || — || February 13, 2000 || Višnjan Observatory || K. Korlević || — || align=right | 2.3 km || 
|-id=230 bgcolor=#d6d6d6
| 17230 ||  || — || February 3, 2000 || Socorro || LINEAR || LIX || align=right | 17 km || 
|-id=231 bgcolor=#d6d6d6
| 17231 ||  || — || February 3, 2000 || Socorro || LINEAR || THM || align=right | 9.8 km || 
|-id=232 bgcolor=#fefefe
| 17232 ||  || — || February 27, 2000 || Oizumi || T. Kobayashi || — || align=right | 5.2 km || 
|-id=233 bgcolor=#fefefe
| 17233 Stanshapiro ||  ||  || February 29, 2000 || Socorro || LINEAR || KLI || align=right | 7.0 km || 
|-id=234 bgcolor=#E9E9E9
| 17234 ||  || — || March 4, 2000 || Socorro || LINEAR || — || align=right | 6.8 km || 
|-id=235 bgcolor=#d6d6d6
| 17235 ||  || — || March 4, 2000 || Socorro || LINEAR || — || align=right | 9.2 km || 
|-id=236 bgcolor=#fefefe
| 17236 ||  || — || March 9, 2000 || Socorro || LINEAR || — || align=right | 4.0 km || 
|-id=237 bgcolor=#E9E9E9
| 17237 ||  || — || March 7, 2000 || Višnjan Observatory || K. Korlević || — || align=right | 2.9 km || 
|-id=238 bgcolor=#d6d6d6
| 17238 ||  || — || March 8, 2000 || Socorro || LINEAR || THM || align=right | 8.2 km || 
|-id=239 bgcolor=#d6d6d6
| 17239 ||  || — || March 9, 2000 || Socorro || LINEAR || — || align=right | 10 km || 
|-id=240 bgcolor=#fefefe
| 17240 Gletorrence ||  ||  || March 9, 2000 || Socorro || LINEAR || — || align=right | 3.9 km || 
|-id=241 bgcolor=#E9E9E9
| 17241 Wooden ||  ||  || March 11, 2000 || Anderson Mesa || LONEOS || EUN || align=right | 5.6 km || 
|-id=242 bgcolor=#E9E9E9
| 17242 Leslieyoung ||  ||  || March 11, 2000 || Anderson Mesa || LONEOS || — || align=right | 2.8 km || 
|-id=243 bgcolor=#E9E9E9
| 17243 ||  || — || March 29, 2000 || Socorro || LINEAR || — || align=right | 9.4 km || 
|-id=244 bgcolor=#d6d6d6
| 17244 ||  || — || March 28, 2000 || Kvistaberg || UDAS || EOS || align=right | 7.4 km || 
|-id=245 bgcolor=#fefefe
| 17245 Yixie||  || — || April 5, 2000 || Socorro || LINEAR || — || align=right | 8.5 km || 
|-id=246 bgcolor=#d6d6d6
| 17246 Christophedumas ||  ||  || April 5, 2000 || Socorro || LINEAR || KORmoon || align=right | 5.5 km || 
|-id=247 bgcolor=#fefefe
| 17247 Vanverst ||  ||  || April 7, 2000 || Socorro || LINEAR || — || align=right | 2.8 km || 
|-id=248 bgcolor=#fefefe
| 17248 ||  || — || April 7, 2000 || Socorro || LINEAR || — || align=right | 2.6 km || 
|-id=249 bgcolor=#d6d6d6
| 17249 Eliotyoung ||  ||  || April 2, 2000 || Anderson Mesa || LONEOS || — || align=right | 8.6 km || 
|-id=250 bgcolor=#E9E9E9
| 17250 Genelucas ||  ||  || April 11, 2000 || Fountain Hills || C. W. Juels || — || align=right | 10 km || 
|-id=251 bgcolor=#fefefe
| 17251 Vondracek ||  ||  || April 7, 2000 || Socorro || LINEAR || FLO || align=right | 5.2 km || 
|-id=252 bgcolor=#d6d6d6
| 17252 ||  || — || April 7, 2000 || Socorro || LINEAR || MEL || align=right | 25 km || 
|-id=253 bgcolor=#fefefe
| 17253 Vonsecker ||  ||  || April 12, 2000 || Socorro || LINEAR || — || align=right | 5.9 km || 
|-id=254 bgcolor=#d6d6d6
| 17254 ||  || — || April 12, 2000 || Socorro || LINEAR || — || align=right | 16 km || 
|-id=255 bgcolor=#E9E9E9
| 17255 ||  || — || April 11, 2000 || Kitt Peak || Spacewatch || — || align=right | 6.3 km || 
|-id=256 bgcolor=#E9E9E9
| 17256 ||  || — || April 30, 2000 || Socorro || LINEAR || — || align=right | 9.6 km || 
|-id=257 bgcolor=#E9E9E9
| 17257 Strazzulla ||  ||  || April 26, 2000 || Anderson Mesa || LONEOS || EUN || align=right | 5.1 km || 
|-id=258 bgcolor=#fefefe
| 17258 Whalen ||  ||  || April 29, 2000 || Socorro || LINEAR || — || align=right | 2.2 km || 
|-id=259 bgcolor=#fefefe
| 17259 ||  || — || May 2, 2000 || Socorro || LINEAR || H || align=right | 2.1 km || 
|-id=260 bgcolor=#fefefe
| 17260 Kušnirák ||  ||  || May 6, 2000 || Socorro || LINEAR || moon || align=right | 3.9 km || 
|-id=261 bgcolor=#d6d6d6
| 17261 ||  || — || May 7, 2000 || Socorro || LINEAR || — || align=right | 8.3 km || 
|-id=262 bgcolor=#fefefe
| 17262 Winokur ||  ||  || May 9, 2000 || Socorro || LINEAR || V || align=right | 2.7 km || 
|-id=263 bgcolor=#E9E9E9
| 17263 ||  || — || May 5, 2000 || Socorro || LINEAR || HNS || align=right | 4.2 km || 
|-id=264 bgcolor=#d6d6d6
| 17264 ||  || — || May 6, 2000 || Socorro || LINEAR || — || align=right | 16 km || 
|-id=265 bgcolor=#fefefe
| 17265 Debennett ||  ||  || May 6, 2000 || Socorro || LINEAR || — || align=right | 2.8 km || 
|-id=266 bgcolor=#E9E9E9
| 17266 ||  || — || May 27, 2000 || Socorro || LINEAR || DOR || align=right | 12 km || 
|-id=267 bgcolor=#d6d6d6
| 17267 ||  || — || May 28, 2000 || Kitt Peak || Spacewatch || — || align=right | 8.6 km || 
|-id=268 bgcolor=#E9E9E9
| 17268 ||  || — || May 29, 2000 || Socorro || LINEAR || AGN || align=right | 4.7 km || 
|-id=269 bgcolor=#E9E9E9
| 17269 Dicksmith ||  ||  || June 3, 2000 || Reedy Creek || J. Broughton || NEM || align=right | 7.5 km || 
|-id=270 bgcolor=#d6d6d6
| 17270 Nolthenius ||  ||  || June 4, 2000 || Reedy Creek || J. Broughton || — || align=right | 13 km || 
|-id=271 bgcolor=#E9E9E9
| 17271 ||  || — || June 4, 2000 || Socorro || LINEAR || HNS || align=right | 7.3 km || 
|-id=272 bgcolor=#d6d6d6
| 17272 ||  || — || June 5, 2000 || Socorro || LINEAR || — || align=right | 5.3 km || 
|-id=273 bgcolor=#fefefe
| 17273 Karnik ||  ||  || June 5, 2000 || Socorro || LINEAR || — || align=right | 4.3 km || 
|-id=274 bgcolor=#FFC2E0
| 17274 ||  || — || June 7, 2000 || Socorro || LINEAR || AMO +1km || align=right | 3.2 km || 
|-id=275 bgcolor=#E9E9E9
| 17275 ||  || — || June 8, 2000 || Socorro || LINEAR || EUN || align=right | 5.6 km || 
|-id=276 bgcolor=#d6d6d6
| 17276 ||  || — || June 4, 2000 || Haleakala || NEAT || — || align=right | 18 km || 
|-id=277 bgcolor=#fefefe
| 17277 Jarrydlevine ||  ||  || June 7, 2000 || Socorro || LINEAR || — || align=right | 3.2 km || 
|-id=278 bgcolor=#fefefe
| 17278 Viggh ||  ||  || June 6, 2000 || Anderson Mesa || LONEOS || V || align=right | 3.1 km || 
|-id=279 bgcolor=#E9E9E9
| 17279 Jeniferevans ||  ||  || June 6, 2000 || Anderson Mesa || LONEOS || EUN || align=right | 7.2 km || 
|-id=280 bgcolor=#fefefe
| 17280 Shelly ||  ||  || June 6, 2000 || Anderson Mesa || LONEOS || — || align=right | 2.9 km || 
|-id=281 bgcolor=#E9E9E9
| 17281 Mattblythe ||  ||  || June 6, 2000 || Anderson Mesa || LONEOS || MRX || align=right | 4.3 km || 
|-id=282 bgcolor=#d6d6d6
| 17282 ||  || — || June 3, 2000 || Kitt Peak || Spacewatch || — || align=right | 7.4 km || 
|-id=283 bgcolor=#d6d6d6
| 17283 Ustinov ||  ||  || June 24, 2000 || Reedy Creek || J. Broughton || — || align=right | 18 km || 
|-id=284 bgcolor=#E9E9E9
| 17284 ||  || — || June 26, 2000 || Socorro || LINEAR || — || align=right | 6.2 km || 
|-id=285 bgcolor=#E9E9E9
| 17285 Bezout || 2000 NU ||  || July 3, 2000 || Prescott || P. G. Comba || — || align=right | 7.4 km || 
|-id=286 bgcolor=#fefefe
| 17286 Bisei ||  ||  || July 8, 2000 || Bisei SG Center || BATTeRS || V || align=right | 4.1 km || 
|-id=287 bgcolor=#E9E9E9
| 17287 ||  || — || July 7, 2000 || Socorro || LINEAR || — || align=right | 7.2 km || 
|-id=288 bgcolor=#fefefe
| 17288 ||  || — || July 10, 2000 || Valinhos || P. R. Holvorcem || FLO || align=right | 3.6 km || 
|-id=289 bgcolor=#d6d6d6
| 17289 || 2037 P-L || — || September 24, 1960 || Palomar || PLS || — || align=right | 15 km || 
|-id=290 bgcolor=#fefefe
| 17290 || 2060 P-L || — || September 24, 1960 || Palomar || PLS || FLO || align=right | 2.5 km || 
|-id=291 bgcolor=#d6d6d6
| 17291 || 2547 P-L || — || September 24, 1960 || Palomar || PLS || THM || align=right | 7.9 km || 
|-id=292 bgcolor=#E9E9E9
| 17292 || 2656 P-L || — || September 24, 1960 || Palomar || PLS || AGN || align=right | 3.5 km || 
|-id=293 bgcolor=#fefefe
| 17293 || 2743 P-L || — || September 24, 1960 || Palomar || PLS || — || align=right | 2.8 km || 
|-id=294 bgcolor=#fefefe
| 17294 || 2787 P-L || — || September 26, 1960 || Palomar || PLS || — || align=right | 4.7 km || 
|-id=295 bgcolor=#fefefe
| 17295 || 2827 P-L || — || September 24, 1960 || Palomar || PLS || FLO || align=right | 2.2 km || 
|-id=296 bgcolor=#d6d6d6
| 17296 || 3541 P-L || — || October 17, 1960 || Palomar || PLS || — || align=right | 7.5 km || 
|-id=297 bgcolor=#d6d6d6
| 17297 || 3560 P-L || — || October 22, 1960 || Palomar || PLS || slow || align=right | 30 km || 
|-id=298 bgcolor=#fefefe
| 17298 || 4031 P-L || — || September 24, 1960 || Palomar || PLS || — || align=right | 6.4 km || 
|-id=299 bgcolor=#E9E9E9
| 17299 || 4168 P-L || — || September 24, 1960 || Palomar || PLS || HEN || align=right | 3.5 km || 
|-id=300 bgcolor=#fefefe
| 17300 || 4321 P-L || — || September 24, 1960 || Palomar || PLS || — || align=right | 1.6 km || 
|}

17301–17400 

|-bgcolor=#E9E9E9
| 17301 || 4609 P-L || — || September 24, 1960 || Palomar || PLS || — || align=right | 7.0 km || 
|-id=302 bgcolor=#E9E9E9
| 17302 || 4610 P-L || — || September 24, 1960 || Palomar || PLS || — || align=right | 4.6 km || 
|-id=303 bgcolor=#fefefe
| 17303 || 4629 P-L || — || September 24, 1960 || Palomar || PLS || — || align=right | 1.8 km || 
|-id=304 bgcolor=#fefefe
| 17304 || 4637 P-L || — || September 24, 1960 || Palomar || PLS || FLO || align=right | 2.2 km || 
|-id=305 bgcolor=#d6d6d6
| 17305 Caniff || 4652 P-L ||  || September 24, 1960 || Palomar || PLS || 3:2 || align=right | 25 km || 
|-id=306 bgcolor=#fefefe
| 17306 || 4865 P-L || — || September 24, 1960 || Palomar || PLS || — || align=right | 1.9 km || 
|-id=307 bgcolor=#E9E9E9
| 17307 || 4895 P-L || — || September 24, 1960 || Palomar || PLS || — || align=right | 9.5 km || 
|-id=308 bgcolor=#d6d6d6
| 17308 || 6079 P-L || — || September 24, 1960 || Palomar || PLS || ALA || align=right | 12 km || 
|-id=309 bgcolor=#d6d6d6
| 17309 || 6528 P-L || — || September 24, 1960 || Palomar || PLS || KOR || align=right | 5.3 km || 
|-id=310 bgcolor=#fefefe
| 17310 || 6574 P-L || — || September 24, 1960 || Palomar || PLS || V || align=right | 4.2 km || 
|-id=311 bgcolor=#E9E9E9
| 17311 || 6584 P-L || — || September 24, 1960 || Palomar || PLS || — || align=right | 7.0 km || 
|-id=312 bgcolor=#fefefe
| 17312 || 7622 P-L || — || October 22, 1960 || Palomar || PLS || FLO || align=right | 3.8 km || 
|-id=313 bgcolor=#d6d6d6
| 17313 || 9542 P-L || — || October 17, 1960 || Palomar || PLS || — || align=right | 5.0 km || 
|-id=314 bgcolor=#C2FFFF
| 17314 Aisakos || 1024 T-1 ||  || March 25, 1971 || Palomar || PLS || L5 || align=right | 36 km || 
|-id=315 bgcolor=#d6d6d6
| 17315 || 1089 T-1 || — || March 25, 1971 || Palomar || PLS || EOS || align=right | 8.0 km || 
|-id=316 bgcolor=#d6d6d6
| 17316 || 1198 T-1 || — || March 25, 1971 || Palomar || PLS || HYG || align=right | 8.9 km || 
|-id=317 bgcolor=#fefefe
| 17317 || 1208 T-1 || — || March 25, 1971 || Palomar || PLS || — || align=right | 3.7 km || 
|-id=318 bgcolor=#E9E9E9
| 17318 || 2091 T-1 || — || March 25, 1971 || Palomar || PLS || — || align=right | 9.2 km || 
|-id=319 bgcolor=#fefefe
| 17319 || 3078 T-1 || — || March 26, 1971 || Palomar || PLS || — || align=right | 2.7 km || 
|-id=320 bgcolor=#d6d6d6
| 17320 || 3182 T-1 || — || March 26, 1971 || Palomar || PLS || — || align=right | 9.8 km || 
|-id=321 bgcolor=#d6d6d6
| 17321 || 3188 T-1 || — || March 26, 1971 || Palomar || PLS || — || align=right | 8.0 km || 
|-id=322 bgcolor=#E9E9E9
| 17322 || 3274 T-1 || — || March 26, 1971 || Palomar || PLS || — || align=right | 5.7 km || 
|-id=323 bgcolor=#d6d6d6
| 17323 || 3284 T-1 || — || March 26, 1971 || Palomar || PLS || EOS || align=right | 6.3 km || 
|-id=324 bgcolor=#E9E9E9
| 17324 || 3292 T-1 || — || March 26, 1971 || Palomar || PLS || — || align=right | 3.1 km || 
|-id=325 bgcolor=#fefefe
| 17325 || 3300 T-1 || — || March 26, 1971 || Palomar || PLS || — || align=right | 3.0 km || 
|-id=326 bgcolor=#fefefe
| 17326 || 4023 T-1 || — || March 26, 1971 || Palomar || PLS || — || align=right | 2.6 km || 
|-id=327 bgcolor=#E9E9E9
| 17327 || 4155 T-1 || — || March 26, 1971 || Palomar || PLS || HEN || align=right | 5.2 km || 
|-id=328 bgcolor=#fefefe
| 17328 || 1176 T-2 || — || September 29, 1973 || Palomar || PLS || NYS || align=right | 2.8 km || 
|-id=329 bgcolor=#d6d6d6
| 17329 || 1277 T-2 || — || September 29, 1973 || Palomar || PLS || THM || align=right | 8.7 km || 
|-id=330 bgcolor=#fefefe
| 17330 || 1358 T-2 || — || September 29, 1973 || Palomar || PLS || — || align=right | 2.5 km || 
|-id=331 bgcolor=#fefefe
| 17331 || 2056 T-2 || — || September 29, 1973 || Palomar || PLS || — || align=right | 2.5 km || 
|-id=332 bgcolor=#fefefe
| 17332 || 2120 T-2 || — || September 29, 1973 || Palomar || PLS || FLO || align=right | 1.7 km || 
|-id=333 bgcolor=#E9E9E9
| 17333 || 2174 T-2 || — || September 29, 1973 || Palomar || PLS || PAD || align=right | 7.3 km || 
|-id=334 bgcolor=#d6d6d6
| 17334 || 2275 T-2 || — || September 29, 1973 || Palomar || PLS || — || align=right | 9.9 km || 
|-id=335 bgcolor=#E9E9E9
| 17335 || 2281 T-2 || — || September 29, 1973 || Palomar || PLS || — || align=right | 5.9 km || 
|-id=336 bgcolor=#d6d6d6
| 17336 || 3193 T-2 || — || September 30, 1973 || Palomar || PLS || — || align=right | 9.2 km || 
|-id=337 bgcolor=#d6d6d6
| 17337 || 3198 T-2 || — || September 30, 1973 || Palomar || PLS || HYG || align=right | 8.8 km || 
|-id=338 bgcolor=#fefefe
| 17338 || 3212 T-2 || — || September 30, 1973 || Palomar || PLS || V || align=right | 1.7 km || 
|-id=339 bgcolor=#E9E9E9
| 17339 || 4060 T-2 || — || September 29, 1973 || Palomar || PLS || HEN || align=right | 2.5 km || 
|-id=340 bgcolor=#d6d6d6
| 17340 || 4096 T-2 || — || September 29, 1973 || Palomar || PLS || EOS || align=right | 5.0 km || 
|-id=341 bgcolor=#fefefe
| 17341 || 4120 T-2 || — || September 29, 1973 || Palomar || PLS || FLO || align=right | 1.3 km || 
|-id=342 bgcolor=#E9E9E9
| 17342 || 5185 T-2 || — || September 25, 1973 || Palomar || PLS || — || align=right | 9.1 km || 
|-id=343 bgcolor=#d6d6d6
| 17343 || 1111 T-3 || — || October 17, 1977 || Palomar || PLS || — || align=right | 5.3 km || 
|-id=344 bgcolor=#E9E9E9
| 17344 || 1120 T-3 || — || October 17, 1977 || Palomar || PLS || GEF || align=right | 4.3 km || 
|-id=345 bgcolor=#fefefe
| 17345 || 2216 T-3 || — || October 16, 1977 || Palomar || PLS || — || align=right | 3.1 km || 
|-id=346 bgcolor=#d6d6d6
| 17346 || 2395 T-3 || — || October 16, 1977 || Palomar || PLS || — || align=right | 10 km || 
|-id=347 bgcolor=#d6d6d6
| 17347 || 3449 T-3 || — || October 16, 1977 || Palomar || PLS || — || align=right | 13 km || 
|-id=348 bgcolor=#fefefe
| 17348 || 4166 T-3 || — || October 16, 1977 || Palomar || PLS || — || align=right | 4.0 km || 
|-id=349 bgcolor=#d6d6d6
| 17349 || 4353 T-3 || — || October 16, 1977 || Palomar || PLS || — || align=right | 14 km || 
|-id=350 bgcolor=#E9E9E9
| 17350 || 1968 OJ || — || July 18, 1968 || Cerro El Roble || C. Torres, S. Cofré || — || align=right | 7.8 km || 
|-id=351 bgcolor=#C2FFFF
| 17351 Pheidippos || 1973 SV ||  || September 19, 1973 || Palomar || PLS || L4 || align=right | 29 km || 
|-id=352 bgcolor=#E9E9E9
| 17352 ||  || — || September 30, 1975 || Palomar || S. J. Bus || — || align=right | 7.5 km || 
|-id=353 bgcolor=#fefefe
| 17353 || 1975 TE || — || October 10, 1975 || Anderson Mesa || H. L. Giclas || — || align=right | 3.7 km || 
|-id=354 bgcolor=#E9E9E9
| 17354 Matrosov ||  ||  || March 13, 1977 || Nauchnij || N. S. Chernykh || — || align=right | 7.1 km || 
|-id=355 bgcolor=#E9E9E9
| 17355 || 1978 NK || — || July 10, 1978 || Palomar || E. F. Helin, E. M. Shoemaker || — || align=right | 5.5 km || 
|-id=356 bgcolor=#fefefe
| 17356 Vityazev ||  ||  || August 9, 1978 || Nauchnij || N. S. Chernykh || FLO || align=right | 2.7 km || 
|-id=357 bgcolor=#E9E9E9
| 17357 Lucataliano ||  ||  || August 23, 1978 || Mount Stromlo || G. DeSanctis, V. Zappalà || — || align=right | 10 km || 
|-id=358 bgcolor=#fefefe
| 17358 Lozino-Lozinskij ||  ||  || September 27, 1978 || Nauchnij || L. I. Chernykh || V || align=right | 3.9 km || 
|-id=359 bgcolor=#E9E9E9
| 17359 ||  || — || October 27, 1978 || Palomar || C. M. Olmstead || — || align=right | 8.2 km || 
|-id=360 bgcolor=#fefefe
| 17360 ||  || — || October 27, 1978 || Palomar || C. M. Olmstead || — || align=right | 1.8 km || 
|-id=361 bgcolor=#d6d6d6
| 17361 ||  || — || October 27, 1978 || Palomar || C. M. Olmstead || MEL || align=right | 8.4 km || 
|-id=362 bgcolor=#d6d6d6
| 17362 ||  || — || October 27, 1978 || Palomar || C. M. Olmstead || — || align=right | 8.9 km || 
|-id=363 bgcolor=#fefefe
| 17363 ||  || — || November 7, 1978 || Palomar || E. F. Helin, S. J. Bus || — || align=right | 4.4 km || 
|-id=364 bgcolor=#E9E9E9
| 17364 ||  || — || November 7, 1978 || Palomar || E. F. Helin, S. J. Bus || — || align=right | 9.7 km || 
|-id=365 bgcolor=#C2FFFF
| 17365 ||  || — || November 7, 1978 || Palomar || E. F. Helin, S. J. Bus || L5moon || align=right | 45 km || 
|-id=366 bgcolor=#d6d6d6
| 17366 ||  || — || July 24, 1979 || Palomar || S. J. Bus || KOR || align=right | 6.3 km || 
|-id=367 bgcolor=#E9E9E9
| 17367 ||  || — || July 26, 1979 || Palomar || S. J. Bus || EUN || align=right | 4.2 km || 
|-id=368 bgcolor=#fefefe
| 17368 Korn ||  ||  || August 22, 1979 || La Silla || C.-I. Lagerkvist || — || align=right | 2.8 km || 
|-id=369 bgcolor=#d6d6d6
| 17369 Eremeeva ||  ||  || August 22, 1979 || La Silla || C.-I. Lagerkvist || KOR || align=right | 5.5 km || 
|-id=370 bgcolor=#d6d6d6
| 17370 || 1980 CJ || — || February 13, 1980 || Harvard Observatory || Harvard Obs. || — || align=right | 15 km || 
|-id=371 bgcolor=#d6d6d6
| 17371 || 1981 DT || — || February 28, 1981 || Siding Spring || S. J. Bus || — || align=right | 10 km || 
|-id=372 bgcolor=#E9E9E9
| 17372 || 1981 DV || — || February 28, 1981 || Siding Spring || S. J. Bus || MAR || align=right | 3.6 km || 
|-id=373 bgcolor=#d6d6d6
| 17373 ||  || — || March 2, 1981 || Siding Spring || S. J. Bus || — || align=right | 9.7 km || 
|-id=374 bgcolor=#fefefe
| 17374 ||  || — || March 2, 1981 || Siding Spring || S. J. Bus || — || align=right | 3.2 km || 
|-id=375 bgcolor=#d6d6d6
| 17375 ||  || — || March 2, 1981 || Siding Spring || S. J. Bus || — || align=right | 4.3 km || 
|-id=376 bgcolor=#d6d6d6
| 17376 ||  || — || March 2, 1981 || Siding Spring || S. J. Bus || — || align=right | 9.0 km || 
|-id=377 bgcolor=#E9E9E9
| 17377 ||  || — || March 2, 1981 || Siding Spring || S. J. Bus || — || align=right | 6.4 km || 
|-id=378 bgcolor=#d6d6d6
| 17378 ||  || — || March 2, 1981 || Siding Spring || S. J. Bus || EOS || align=right | 6.9 km || 
|-id=379 bgcolor=#fefefe
| 17379 ||  || — || March 1, 1981 || Siding Spring || S. J. Bus || — || align=right | 2.8 km || 
|-id=380 bgcolor=#fefefe
| 17380 ||  || — || March 1, 1981 || Siding Spring || S. J. Bus || FLO || align=right | 2.4 km || 
|-id=381 bgcolor=#E9E9E9
| 17381 ||  || — || March 1, 1981 || Siding Spring || S. J. Bus || — || align=right | 4.5 km || 
|-id=382 bgcolor=#E9E9E9
| 17382 ||  || — || March 1, 1981 || Siding Spring || S. J. Bus || EUN || align=right | 5.1 km || 
|-id=383 bgcolor=#fefefe
| 17383 ||  || — || March 1, 1981 || Siding Spring || S. J. Bus || V || align=right | 2.4 km || 
|-id=384 bgcolor=#d6d6d6
| 17384 ||  || — || March 1, 1981 || Siding Spring || S. J. Bus || URS || align=right | 6.4 km || 
|-id=385 bgcolor=#fefefe
| 17385 ||  || — || March 1, 1981 || Siding Spring || S. J. Bus || — || align=right | 4.0 km || 
|-id=386 bgcolor=#E9E9E9
| 17386 ||  || — || March 2, 1981 || Siding Spring || S. J. Bus || — || align=right | 3.2 km || 
|-id=387 bgcolor=#E9E9E9
| 17387 ||  || — || March 3, 1981 || Siding Spring || S. J. Bus || RAF || align=right | 3.0 km || 
|-id=388 bgcolor=#E9E9E9
| 17388 ||  || — || March 2, 1981 || Siding Spring || S. J. Bus || EUN || align=right | 3.7 km || 
|-id=389 bgcolor=#d6d6d6
| 17389 ||  || — || March 2, 1981 || Siding Spring || S. J. Bus || THM || align=right | 11 km || 
|-id=390 bgcolor=#d6d6d6
| 17390 ||  || — || March 1, 1981 || Siding Spring || S. J. Bus || — || align=right | 7.9 km || 
|-id=391 bgcolor=#fefefe
| 17391 ||  || — || March 2, 1981 || Siding Spring || S. J. Bus || — || align=right | 2.9 km || 
|-id=392 bgcolor=#E9E9E9
| 17392 ||  || — || March 2, 1981 || Siding Spring || S. J. Bus || HEN || align=right | 2.8 km || 
|-id=393 bgcolor=#d6d6d6
| 17393 ||  || — || March 2, 1981 || Siding Spring || S. J. Bus || — || align=right | 7.4 km || 
|-id=394 bgcolor=#d6d6d6
| 17394 ||  || — || March 2, 1981 || Siding Spring || S. J. Bus || — || align=right | 8.7 km || 
|-id=395 bgcolor=#E9E9E9
| 17395 ||  || — || March 6, 1981 || Siding Spring || S. J. Bus || EUN || align=right | 4.5 km || 
|-id=396 bgcolor=#fefefe
| 17396 ||  || — || March 1, 1981 || Siding Spring || S. J. Bus || V || align=right | 2.4 km || 
|-id=397 bgcolor=#d6d6d6
| 17397 ||  || — || March 6, 1981 || Siding Spring || S. J. Bus || 3:2 || align=right | 13 km || 
|-id=398 bgcolor=#E9E9E9
| 17398 ||  || — || October 20, 1982 || Kitt Peak || G. Aldering || — || align=right | 9.6 km || 
|-id=399 bgcolor=#fefefe
| 17399 Andysanto || 1983 RL ||  || September 6, 1983 || Palomar || C. S. Shoemaker, E. M. Shoemaker || H || align=right | 3.1 km || 
|-id=400 bgcolor=#d6d6d6
| 17400 ||  || — || August 13, 1985 || Harvard Observatory || Oak Ridge Observatory || — || align=right | 7.7 km || 
|}

17401–17500 

|-bgcolor=#fefefe
| 17401 ||  || — || September 7, 1985 || La Silla || H. Debehogne || NYS || align=right | 3.2 km || 
|-id=402 bgcolor=#fefefe
| 17402 Valeryshuvalov || 1985 UF ||  || October 20, 1985 || Anderson Mesa || E. Bowell || — || align=right | 3.6 km || 
|-id=403 bgcolor=#E9E9E9
| 17403 Masciarelli ||  ||  || March 6, 1986 || La Silla || G. DeSanctis || — || align=right | 6.8 km || 
|-id=404 bgcolor=#fefefe
| 17404 ||  || — || October 4, 1986 || Kleť || A. Mrkos || — || align=right | 3.3 km || 
|-id=405 bgcolor=#fefefe
| 17405 ||  || — || November 4, 1986 || Caussols || CERGA || FLO || align=right | 3.3 km || 
|-id=406 bgcolor=#fefefe
| 17406 || 1987 DO || — || February 25, 1987 || Ojima || T. Niijima, T. Urata || NYS || align=right | 2.7 km || 
|-id=407 bgcolor=#E9E9E9
| 17407 Teige || 1987 TG ||  || October 14, 1987 || Kleť || A. Mrkos || — || align=right | 9.0 km || 
|-id=408 bgcolor=#fefefe
| 17408 McAdams ||  ||  || October 19, 1987 || Palomar || C. S. Shoemaker, E. M. Shoemaker || H || align=right | 3.3 km || 
|-id=409 bgcolor=#fefefe
| 17409 ||  || — || January 19, 1988 || La Silla || H. Debehogne || V || align=right | 2.5 km || 
|-id=410 bgcolor=#fefefe
| 17410 ||  || — || February 13, 1988 || La Silla || E. W. Elst || V || align=right | 3.4 km || 
|-id=411 bgcolor=#fefefe
| 17411 ||  || — || February 22, 1988 || Siding Spring || R. H. McNaught || — || align=right | 3.6 km || 
|-id=412 bgcolor=#fefefe
| 17412 Kroll || 1988 KV ||  || May 24, 1988 || La Silla || W. Landgraf || — || align=right | 2.8 km || 
|-id=413 bgcolor=#d6d6d6
| 17413 ||  || — || September 1, 1988 || La Silla || H. Debehogne || — || align=right | 10 km || 
|-id=414 bgcolor=#C2FFFF
| 17414 ||  || — || September 14, 1988 || Cerro Tololo || S. J. Bus || L5 || align=right | 22 km || 
|-id=415 bgcolor=#C2FFFF
| 17415 ||  || — || September 14, 1988 || Cerro Tololo || S. J. Bus || L5 || align=right | 18 km || 
|-id=416 bgcolor=#C2FFFF
| 17416 ||  || — || September 14, 1988 || Cerro Tololo || S. J. Bus || L5 || align=right | 18 km || 
|-id=417 bgcolor=#C2FFFF
| 17417 ||  || — || September 14, 1988 || Cerro Tololo || S. J. Bus || L5 || align=right | 28 km || 
|-id=418 bgcolor=#C2FFFF
| 17418 ||  || — || September 14, 1988 || Cerro Tololo || S. J. Bus || L5 || align=right | 16 km || 
|-id=419 bgcolor=#C2FFFF
| 17419 ||  || — || September 14, 1988 || Cerro Tololo || S. J. Bus || L5 || align=right | 33 km || 
|-id=420 bgcolor=#C2FFFF
| 17420 ||  || — || September 14, 1988 || Cerro Tololo || S. J. Bus || L5 || align=right | 18 km || 
|-id=421 bgcolor=#C2FFFF
| 17421 ||  || — || September 16, 1988 || Cerro Tololo || S. J. Bus || L5 || align=right | 24 km || 
|-id=422 bgcolor=#fefefe
| 17422 ||  || — || September 16, 1988 || Cerro Tololo || S. J. Bus || — || align=right | 4.0 km || 
|-id=423 bgcolor=#C2FFFF
| 17423 ||  || — || September 16, 1988 || Cerro Tololo || S. J. Bus || L5 || align=right | 15 km || 
|-id=424 bgcolor=#C2FFFF
| 17424 ||  || — || September 16, 1988 || Cerro Tololo || S. J. Bus || L5 || align=right | 18 km || 
|-id=425 bgcolor=#E9E9E9
| 17425 ||  || — || January 4, 1989 || Siding Spring || R. H. McNaught || ADE || align=right | 9.5 km || 
|-id=426 bgcolor=#E9E9E9
| 17426 ||  || — || February 5, 1989 || Gekko || Y. Oshima || EUN || align=right | 5.5 km || 
|-id=427 bgcolor=#d6d6d6
| 17427 Poe ||  ||  || February 4, 1989 || La Silla || E. W. Elst || 7:4 || align=right | 14 km || 
|-id=428 bgcolor=#d6d6d6
| 17428 Charleroi || 1989 DL ||  || February 28, 1989 || La Silla || H. Debehogne || HIL3:2 || align=right | 30 km || 
|-id=429 bgcolor=#fefefe
| 17429 ||  || — || April 3, 1989 || La Silla || E. W. Elst || FLO || align=right | 1.9 km || 
|-id=430 bgcolor=#d6d6d6
| 17430 || 1989 KF || — || May 31, 1989 || Palomar || H. E. Holt || BRA || align=right | 11 km || 
|-id=431 bgcolor=#fefefe
| 17431 Sainte-Colombe || 1989 RT ||  || September 3, 1989 || Haute Provence || E. W. Elst || V || align=right | 4.4 km || 
|-id=432 bgcolor=#d6d6d6
| 17432 || 1989 SR || — || September 29, 1989 || Kushiro || S. Ueda, H. Kaneda || EOS || align=right | 8.3 km || 
|-id=433 bgcolor=#d6d6d6
| 17433 ||  || — || September 26, 1989 || La Silla || E. W. Elst || EOS || align=right | 8.2 km || 
|-id=434 bgcolor=#d6d6d6
| 17434 ||  || — || September 26, 1989 || La Silla || E. W. Elst || HYG || align=right | 7.2 km || 
|-id=435 bgcolor=#FA8072
| 17435 di Giovanni ||  ||  || September 26, 1989 || La Silla || E. W. Elst || PHO || align=right | 3.1 km || 
|-id=436 bgcolor=#fefefe
| 17436 ||  || — || September 26, 1989 || La Silla || E. W. Elst || — || align=right | 2.4 km || 
|-id=437 bgcolor=#d6d6d6
| 17437 Stekene ||  ||  || September 26, 1989 || La Silla || E. W. Elst || ALA || align=right | 14 km || 
|-id=438 bgcolor=#fefefe
| 17438 Quasimodo ||  ||  || September 26, 1989 || La Silla || E. W. Elst || NYS || align=right | 5.5 km || 
|-id=439 bgcolor=#d6d6d6
| 17439 Juliesan ||  ||  || October 7, 1989 || La Silla || E. W. Elst || VER || align=right | 8.6 km || 
|-id=440 bgcolor=#d6d6d6
| 17440 ||  || — || October 2, 1989 || La Silla || H. Debehogne || — || align=right | 13 km || 
|-id=441 bgcolor=#fefefe
| 17441 || 1989 UE || — || October 20, 1989 || Kani || Y. Mizuno, T. Furuta || NYS || align=right | 3.0 km || 
|-id=442 bgcolor=#C2FFFF
| 17442 ||  || — || October 30, 1989 || Cerro Tololo || S. J. Bus || L5 || align=right | 23 km || 
|-id=443 bgcolor=#d6d6d6
| 17443 ||  || — || October 30, 1989 || Cerro Tololo || S. J. Bus || — || align=right | 12 km || 
|-id=444 bgcolor=#fefefe
| 17444 ||  || — || November 3, 1989 || La Silla || E. W. Elst || — || align=right | 3.0 km || 
|-id=445 bgcolor=#d6d6d6
| 17445 Avatcha ||  ||  || December 28, 1989 || Haute Provence || E. W. Elst || — || align=right | 20 km || 
|-id=446 bgcolor=#fefefe
| 17446 Mopaku ||  ||  || January 23, 1990 || Kavalur || R. Rajamohan || V || align=right | 4.8 km || 
|-id=447 bgcolor=#fefefe
| 17447 Heindl || 1990 HE ||  || April 25, 1990 || Palomar || E. F. Helin || H || align=right | 3.5 km || 
|-id=448 bgcolor=#E9E9E9
| 17448 ||  || — || April 27, 1990 || Siding Spring || R. H. McNaught || — || align=right | 4.2 km || 
|-id=449 bgcolor=#E9E9E9
| 17449 ||  || — || July 27, 1990 || Palomar || H. E. Holt || DOR || align=right | 11 km || 
|-id=450 bgcolor=#d6d6d6
| 17450 ||  || — || August 23, 1990 || Palomar || H. E. Holt || EOS || align=right | 7.5 km || 
|-id=451 bgcolor=#fefefe
| 17451 ||  || — || August 16, 1990 || La Silla || E. W. Elst || — || align=right | 2.5 km || 
|-id=452 bgcolor=#d6d6d6
| 17452 Amurreka ||  ||  || August 16, 1990 || La Silla || E. W. Elst || — || align=right | 8.3 km || 
|-id=453 bgcolor=#fefefe
| 17453 ||  || — || September 14, 1990 || Palomar || H. E. Holt || FLO || align=right | 3.6 km || 
|-id=454 bgcolor=#fefefe
| 17454 ||  || — || September 22, 1990 || La Silla || E. W. Elst || — || align=right | 2.1 km || 
|-id=455 bgcolor=#d6d6d6
| 17455 ||  || — || September 22, 1990 || La Silla || E. W. Elst || KOR || align=right | 4.8 km || 
|-id=456 bgcolor=#d6d6d6
| 17456 ||  || — || September 22, 1990 || La Silla || E. W. Elst || KOR || align=right | 5.6 km || 
|-id=457 bgcolor=#fefefe
| 17457 ||  || — || September 16, 1990 || Palomar || H. E. Holt || — || align=right | 2.3 km || 
|-id=458 bgcolor=#d6d6d6
| 17458 Dick ||  ||  || October 13, 1990 || Tautenburg Observatory || L. D. Schmadel, F. Börngen || — || align=right | 4.5 km || 
|-id=459 bgcolor=#fefefe
| 17459 Andreashofer ||  ||  || October 13, 1990 || Tautenburg Observatory || F. Börngen, L. D. Schmadel || FLO || align=right | 4.0 km || 
|-id=460 bgcolor=#fefefe
| 17460 Mang ||  ||  || October 10, 1990 || Tautenburg Observatory || L. D. Schmadel, F. Börngen || — || align=right | 2.1 km || 
|-id=461 bgcolor=#d6d6d6
| 17461 Shigosenger ||  ||  || October 20, 1990 || Geisei || T. Seki || — || align=right | 6.9 km || 
|-id=462 bgcolor=#fefefe
| 17462 Takahisa ||  ||  || October 22, 1990 || Kitami || K. Endate, K. Watanabe || — || align=right | 2.8 km || 
|-id=463 bgcolor=#E9E9E9
| 17463 ||  || — || October 16, 1990 || La Silla || E. W. Elst || ADE || align=right | 10 km || 
|-id=464 bgcolor=#fefefe
| 17464 ||  || — || November 11, 1990 || Fujieda || H. Shiozawa, M. Kizawa || — || align=right | 3.4 km || 
|-id=465 bgcolor=#d6d6d6
| 17465 Inawashiroko ||  ||  || November 11, 1990 || Geisei || T. Seki || — || align=right | 7.0 km || 
|-id=466 bgcolor=#fefefe
| 17466 Vargasllosa ||  ||  || November 15, 1990 || La Silla || E. W. Elst || — || align=right | 2.6 km || 
|-id=467 bgcolor=#d6d6d6
| 17467 ||  || — || November 15, 1990 || La Silla || E. W. Elst || — || align=right | 7.0 km || 
|-id=468 bgcolor=#fefefe
| 17468 ||  || — || November 21, 1990 || La Silla || E. W. Elst || FLO || align=right | 2.7 km || 
|-id=469 bgcolor=#fefefe
| 17469 || 1991 BT || — || January 19, 1991 || Dynic || A. Sugie || V || align=right | 6.0 km || 
|-id=470 bgcolor=#d6d6d6
| 17470 Mitsuhashi || 1991 BX ||  || January 19, 1991 || Kitami || K. Endate, K. Watanabe || HYG || align=right | 12 km || 
|-id=471 bgcolor=#fefefe
| 17471 ||  || — || March 11, 1991 || La Silla || H. Debehogne || NYS || align=right | 3.8 km || 
|-id=472 bgcolor=#fefefe
| 17472 Dinah || 1991 FY ||  || March 17, 1991 || Ojima || T. Niijima, T. Urata || — || align=right | 4.2 km || 
|-id=473 bgcolor=#fefefe
| 17473 Freddiemercury ||  ||  || March 21, 1991 || La Silla || H. Debehogne || MAS || align=right | 3.4 km || 
|-id=474 bgcolor=#fefefe
| 17474 ||  || — || April 8, 1991 || La Silla || E. W. Elst || NYS || align=right | 2.7 km || 
|-id=475 bgcolor=#fefefe
| 17475 ||  || — || April 8, 1991 || La Silla || E. W. Elst || — || align=right | 3.4 km || 
|-id=476 bgcolor=#fefefe
| 17476 ||  || — || April 8, 1991 || La Silla || E. W. Elst || — || align=right | 3.1 km || 
|-id=477 bgcolor=#fefefe
| 17477 ||  || — || April 10, 1991 || La Silla || E. W. Elst || — || align=right | 2.4 km || 
|-id=478 bgcolor=#E9E9E9
| 17478 || 1991 LQ || — || June 13, 1991 || Palomar || E. F. Helin || EUN || align=right | 5.1 km || 
|-id=479 bgcolor=#E9E9E9
| 17479 ||  || — || August 13, 1991 || Palomar || E. F. Helin || — || align=right | 6.4 km || 
|-id=480 bgcolor=#E9E9E9
| 17480 ||  || — || August 7, 1991 || Palomar || H. E. Holt || GEF || align=right | 4.3 km || 
|-id=481 bgcolor=#E9E9E9
| 17481 ||  || — || August 7, 1991 || Palomar || H. E. Holt || MRX || align=right | 4.3 km || 
|-id=482 bgcolor=#E9E9E9
| 17482 ||  || — || August 6, 1991 || Palomar || H. E. Holt || — || align=right | 5.8 km || 
|-id=483 bgcolor=#fefefe
| 17483 || 1991 RA || — || September 2, 1991 || Siding Spring || K. S. Russell || H || align=right | 1.6 km || 
|-id=484 bgcolor=#E9E9E9
| 17484 Ganghofer ||  ||  || September 13, 1991 || Tautenburg Observatory || F. Börngen, L. D. Schmadel || — || align=right | 4.7 km || 
|-id=485 bgcolor=#E9E9E9
| 17485 ||  || — || September 5, 1991 || Siding Spring || R. H. McNaught || MAR || align=right | 6.3 km || 
|-id=486 bgcolor=#E9E9E9
| 17486 Hodler ||  ||  || September 10, 1991 || Tautenburg Observatory || F. Börngen || — || align=right | 4.9 km || 
|-id=487 bgcolor=#E9E9E9
| 17487 || 1991 SY || — || September 30, 1991 || Siding Spring || R. H. McNaught || EUN || align=right | 6.0 km || 
|-id=488 bgcolor=#E9E9E9
| 17488 Mantl ||  ||  || October 2, 1991 || Tautenburg Observatory || L. D. Schmadel, F. Börngen || MRX || align=right | 3.9 km || 
|-id=489 bgcolor=#E9E9E9
| 17489 Trenker ||  ||  || October 2, 1991 || Tautenburg Observatory || F. Börngen, L. D. Schmadel || — || align=right | 3.2 km || 
|-id=490 bgcolor=#E9E9E9
| 17490 ||  || — || October 31, 1991 || Kushiro || S. Ueda, H. Kaneda || — || align=right | 6.9 km || 
|-id=491 bgcolor=#E9E9E9
| 17491 ||  || — || October 31, 1991 || Kushiro || S. Ueda, H. Kaneda || — || align=right | 10 km || 
|-id=492 bgcolor=#C2FFFF
| 17492 Hippasos ||  ||  || December 10, 1991 || Tautenburg Observatory || F. Börngen || L5ENM || align=right | 54 km || 
|-id=493 bgcolor=#FA8072
| 17493 Wildcat || 1991 YA ||  || December 31, 1991 || Palomar || C. S. Shoemaker, D. H. Levy || Tj (2.83) || align=right | 6.7 km || 
|-id=494 bgcolor=#E9E9E9
| 17494 Antaviana ||  ||  || January 11, 1992 || Mérida || O. A. Naranjo || — || align=right | 9.5 km || 
|-id=495 bgcolor=#fefefe
| 17495 || 1992 DY || — || February 27, 1992 || Uenohara || N. Kawasato || — || align=right | 3.7 km || 
|-id=496 bgcolor=#fefefe
| 17496 Augustinus ||  ||  || February 29, 1992 || Tautenburg Observatory || F. Börngen || — || align=right | 2.3 km || 
|-id=497 bgcolor=#d6d6d6
| 17497 ||  || — || February 29, 1992 || La Silla || UESAC || — || align=right | 5.8 km || 
|-id=498 bgcolor=#fefefe
| 17498 ||  || — || March 1, 1992 || La Silla || UESAC || — || align=right | 2.9 km || 
|-id=499 bgcolor=#fefefe
| 17499 ||  || — || March 1, 1992 || La Silla || UESAC || — || align=right | 2.1 km || 
|-id=500 bgcolor=#d6d6d6
| 17500 ||  || — || March 6, 1992 || La Silla || UESAC || — || align=right | 6.8 km || 
|}

17501–17600 

|-bgcolor=#fefefe
| 17501 Tetsuro || 1992 FG ||  || March 23, 1992 || Kitami || K. Endate, K. Watanabe || FLO || align=right | 5.5 km || 
|-id=502 bgcolor=#fefefe
| 17502 Manabeseiji ||  ||  || March 23, 1992 || Kitami || K. Endate, K. Watanabe || — || align=right | 3.0 km || 
|-id=503 bgcolor=#fefefe
| 17503 Celestechild ||  ||  || March 26, 1992 || Siding Spring || R. H. McNaught || PHO || align=right | 2.9 km || 
|-id=504 bgcolor=#fefefe
| 17504 ||  || — || April 4, 1992 || La Silla || E. W. Elst || FLO || align=right | 2.6 km || 
|-id=505 bgcolor=#fefefe
| 17505 ||  || — || April 4, 1992 || La Silla || E. W. Elst || — || align=right | 2.6 km || 
|-id=506 bgcolor=#fefefe
| 17506 Walschap ||  ||  || April 4, 1992 || La Silla || E. W. Elst || — || align=right | 2.4 km || 
|-id=507 bgcolor=#fefefe
| 17507 ||  || — || April 24, 1992 || La Silla || H. Debehogne || — || align=right | 3.3 km || 
|-id=508 bgcolor=#fefefe
| 17508 Takumadan || 1992 JH ||  || May 3, 1992 || Geisei || T. Seki || NYS || align=right | 6.9 km || 
|-id=509 bgcolor=#fefefe
| 17509 Ikumadan || 1992 JR ||  || May 4, 1992 || Geisei || T. Seki || — || align=right | 3.5 km || 
|-id=510 bgcolor=#fefefe
| 17510 ||  || — || August 1, 1992 || La Silla || H. Debehogne, Á. López-G. || — || align=right | 2.5 km || 
|-id=511 bgcolor=#FFC2E0
| 17511 || 1992 QN || — || August 29, 1992 || Palomar || E. F. Helin, J. Alu || APO +1km || align=right | 1.3 km || 
|-id=512 bgcolor=#fefefe
| 17512 || 1992 RN || — || September 4, 1992 || Kiyosato || S. Otomo || — || align=right | 5.7 km || 
|-id=513 bgcolor=#E9E9E9
| 17513 || 1992 UM || — || October 19, 1992 || Kushiro || S. Ueda, H. Kaneda || — || align=right | 4.0 km || 
|-id=514 bgcolor=#E9E9E9
| 17514 ||  || — || October 19, 1992 || Kushiro || S. Ueda, H. Kaneda || — || align=right | 7.9 km || 
|-id=515 bgcolor=#E9E9E9
| 17515 ||  || — || October 21, 1992 || Dynic || A. Sugie || — || align=right | 3.8 km || 
|-id=516 bgcolor=#E9E9E9
| 17516 Kogayukihito ||  ||  || October 28, 1992 || Kitami || M. Yanai, K. Watanabe || — || align=right | 4.4 km || 
|-id=517 bgcolor=#E9E9E9
| 17517 ||  || — || November 21, 1992 || Kushiro || S. Ueda, H. Kaneda || EUN || align=right | 4.1 km || 
|-id=518 bgcolor=#E9E9E9
| 17518 Redqueen || 1992 YD ||  || December 18, 1992 || Yakiimo || A. Natori, T. Urata || — || align=right | 7.0 km || 
|-id=519 bgcolor=#E9E9E9
| 17519 Pritsak ||  ||  || December 18, 1992 || Caussols || E. W. Elst || EUN || align=right | 6.5 km || 
|-id=520 bgcolor=#E9E9E9
| 17520 Hisayukiyoshio ||  ||  || January 23, 1993 || Kitami || K. Endate, K. Watanabe || MIT || align=right | 12 km || 
|-id=521 bgcolor=#E9E9E9
| 17521 Kiek ||  ||  || January 27, 1993 || Caussols || E. W. Elst || — || align=right | 8.9 km || 
|-id=522 bgcolor=#E9E9E9
| 17522 ||  || — || January 23, 1993 || La Silla || E. W. Elst || — || align=right | 9.2 km || 
|-id=523 bgcolor=#d6d6d6
| 17523 ||  || — || March 23, 1993 || Kitt Peak || Spacewatch || KOR || align=right | 4.9 km || 
|-id=524 bgcolor=#d6d6d6
| 17524 ||  || — || March 17, 1993 || La Silla || UESAC || THM || align=right | 6.9 km || 
|-id=525 bgcolor=#d6d6d6
| 17525 ||  || — || March 17, 1993 || La Silla || UESAC || KOR || align=right | 4.5 km || 
|-id=526 bgcolor=#d6d6d6
| 17526 ||  || — || March 17, 1993 || La Silla || UESAC || THM || align=right | 7.0 km || 
|-id=527 bgcolor=#d6d6d6
| 17527 ||  || — || March 17, 1993 || La Silla || UESAC || — || align=right | 4.9 km || 
|-id=528 bgcolor=#d6d6d6
| 17528 ||  || — || March 17, 1993 || La Silla || UESAC || EOS || align=right | 5.2 km || 
|-id=529 bgcolor=#d6d6d6
| 17529 ||  || — || March 21, 1993 || La Silla || UESAC || — || align=right | 11 km || 
|-id=530 bgcolor=#d6d6d6
| 17530 ||  || — || March 21, 1993 || La Silla || UESAC || TIR || align=right | 6.9 km || 
|-id=531 bgcolor=#E9E9E9
| 17531 ||  || — || March 21, 1993 || La Silla || UESAC || — || align=right | 8.7 km || 
|-id=532 bgcolor=#d6d6d6
| 17532 ||  || — || March 19, 1993 || La Silla || UESAC || EOS || align=right | 4.3 km || 
|-id=533 bgcolor=#d6d6d6
| 17533 ||  || — || March 19, 1993 || La Silla || UESAC || THM || align=right | 9.2 km || 
|-id=534 bgcolor=#d6d6d6
| 17534 ||  || — || March 19, 1993 || La Silla || UESAC || — || align=right | 8.9 km || 
|-id=535 bgcolor=#d6d6d6
| 17535 ||  || — || March 19, 1993 || La Silla || UESAC || — || align=right | 5.7 km || 
|-id=536 bgcolor=#d6d6d6
| 17536 ||  || — || March 19, 1993 || La Silla || UESAC || — || align=right | 6.2 km || 
|-id=537 bgcolor=#d6d6d6
| 17537 ||  || — || March 19, 1993 || La Silla || UESAC || KOR || align=right | 6.0 km || 
|-id=538 bgcolor=#d6d6d6
| 17538 ||  || — || March 19, 1993 || La Silla || UESAC || — || align=right | 7.5 km || 
|-id=539 bgcolor=#d6d6d6
| 17539 ||  || — || March 19, 1993 || La Silla || UESAC || — || align=right | 4.5 km || 
|-id=540 bgcolor=#d6d6d6
| 17540 ||  || — || March 18, 1993 || La Silla || UESAC || — || align=right | 7.0 km || 
|-id=541 bgcolor=#fefefe
| 17541 ||  || — || July 20, 1993 || La Silla || E. W. Elst || — || align=right | 1.4 km || 
|-id=542 bgcolor=#fefefe
| 17542 ||  || — || July 20, 1993 || La Silla || E. W. Elst || NYS || align=right | 2.0 km || 
|-id=543 bgcolor=#d6d6d6
| 17543 Sosva ||  ||  || August 14, 1993 || Caussols || E. W. Elst || — || align=right | 10 km || 
|-id=544 bgcolor=#fefefe
| 17544 Kojiroishikawa ||  ||  || September 15, 1993 || Kitami || K. Endate, K. Watanabe || FLO || align=right | 3.5 km || 
|-id=545 bgcolor=#fefefe
| 17545 ||  || — || September 15, 1993 || La Silla || E. W. Elst || — || align=right | 3.0 km || 
|-id=546 bgcolor=#fefefe
| 17546 Osadakentaro ||  ||  || September 19, 1993 || Kitami || K. Endate, K. Watanabe || — || align=right | 4.0 km || 
|-id=547 bgcolor=#fefefe
| 17547 Nestebovelli ||  ||  || September 21, 1993 || Stroncone || A. Vagnozzi || NYS || align=right | 3.0 km || 
|-id=548 bgcolor=#fefefe
| 17548 ||  || — || September 17, 1993 || La Silla || E. W. Elst || — || align=right | 3.0 km || 
|-id=549 bgcolor=#fefefe
| 17549 ||  || — || October 13, 1993 || Palomar || H. E. Holt || — || align=right | 3.4 km || 
|-id=550 bgcolor=#fefefe
| 17550 ||  || — || October 9, 1993 || La Silla || E. W. Elst || NYS || align=right | 2.4 km || 
|-id=551 bgcolor=#fefefe
| 17551 ||  || — || October 9, 1993 || La Silla || E. W. Elst || — || align=right | 2.9 km || 
|-id=552 bgcolor=#fefefe
| 17552 ||  || — || October 9, 1993 || La Silla || E. W. Elst || — || align=right | 1.9 km || 
|-id=553 bgcolor=#fefefe
| 17553 ||  || — || October 20, 1993 || La Silla || E. W. Elst || V || align=right | 2.3 km || 
|-id=554 bgcolor=#fefefe
| 17554 || 1993 VY || — || November 9, 1993 || Palomar || E. F. Helin || PHO || align=right | 4.3 km || 
|-id=555 bgcolor=#FA8072
| 17555 Kenkennedy ||  ||  || November 4, 1993 || Siding Spring || R. H. McNaught || PHO || align=right | 2.6 km || 
|-id=556 bgcolor=#fefefe
| 17556 Pierofrancesca || 1993 WB ||  || November 16, 1993 || Colleverde || V. S. Casulli || NYS || align=right | 2.8 km || 
|-id=557 bgcolor=#fefefe
| 17557 || 1994 AX || — || January 4, 1994 || Oizumi || T. Kobayashi || NYS || align=right | 2.5 km || 
|-id=558 bgcolor=#fefefe
| 17558 ||  || — || January 4, 1994 || Yatsugatake || Y. Kushida, O. Muramatsu || — || align=right | 4.3 km || 
|-id=559 bgcolor=#fefefe
| 17559 ||  || — || January 8, 1994 || Dynic || A. Sugie || — || align=right | 4.1 km || 
|-id=560 bgcolor=#fefefe
| 17560 ||  || — || January 14, 1994 || Sormano || C. Gualdoni, A. Testa || — || align=right | 2.2 km || 
|-id=561 bgcolor=#fefefe
| 17561 ||  || — || January 8, 1994 || Kitt Peak || Spacewatch || — || align=right | 5.8 km || 
|-id=562 bgcolor=#fefefe
| 17562 ||  || — || January 16, 1994 || Caussols || E. W. Elst, C. Pollas || V || align=right | 3.6 km || 
|-id=563 bgcolor=#E9E9E9
| 17563 Tsuneyoshi ||  ||  || February 5, 1994 || Yatsugatake || Y. Kushida, O. Muramatsu || — || align=right | 8.4 km || 
|-id=564 bgcolor=#fefefe
| 17564 ||  || — || February 7, 1994 || Oizumi || T. Kobayashi || — || align=right | 3.3 km || 
|-id=565 bgcolor=#E9E9E9
| 17565 ||  || — || February 12, 1994 || Oizumi || T. Kobayashi || MAR || align=right | 4.4 km || 
|-id=566 bgcolor=#E9E9E9
| 17566 ||  || — || February 7, 1994 || La Silla || E. W. Elst || — || align=right | 7.0 km || 
|-id=567 bgcolor=#E9E9E9
| 17567 Hoshinoyakata || 1994 GP ||  || April 5, 1994 || Kitami || K. Endate, K. Watanabe || DOR || align=right | 17 km || 
|-id=568 bgcolor=#E9E9E9
| 17568 ||  || — || April 11, 1994 || Palomar || E. F. Helin || — || align=right | 11 km || 
|-id=569 bgcolor=#E9E9E9
| 17569 ||  || — || June 8, 1994 || La Silla || H. Debehogne, E. W. Elst || — || align=right | 6.6 km || 
|-id=570 bgcolor=#fefefe
| 17570 || 1994 NQ || — || July 6, 1994 || Palomar || E. F. Helin || PHO || align=right | 3.6 km || 
|-id=571 bgcolor=#d6d6d6
| 17571 || 1994 PV || — || August 14, 1994 || Oizumi || T. Kobayashi || HYG || align=right | 15 km || 
|-id=572 bgcolor=#d6d6d6
| 17572 ||  || — || August 10, 1994 || La Silla || E. W. Elst || KOR || align=right | 5.7 km || 
|-id=573 bgcolor=#d6d6d6
| 17573 ||  || — || August 10, 1994 || La Silla || E. W. Elst || THM || align=right | 10 km || 
|-id=574 bgcolor=#d6d6d6
| 17574 ||  || — || August 10, 1994 || La Silla || E. W. Elst || — || align=right | 6.9 km || 
|-id=575 bgcolor=#d6d6d6
| 17575 ||  || — || August 10, 1994 || La Silla || E. W. Elst || — || align=right | 8.7 km || 
|-id=576 bgcolor=#d6d6d6
| 17576 ||  || — || August 12, 1994 || La Silla || E. W. Elst || EOS || align=right | 5.4 km || 
|-id=577 bgcolor=#d6d6d6
| 17577 ||  || — || August 10, 1994 || La Silla || E. W. Elst || — || align=right | 7.9 km || 
|-id=578 bgcolor=#d6d6d6
| 17578 || 1994 QQ || — || August 16, 1994 || Oizumi || T. Kobayashi || — || align=right | 11 km || 
|-id=579 bgcolor=#fefefe
| 17579 Lewkopelew ||  ||  || October 5, 1994 || Tautenburg Observatory || F. Börngen || V || align=right | 1.9 km || 
|-id=580 bgcolor=#E9E9E9
| 17580 || 1994 VV || — || November 3, 1994 || Oizumi || T. Kobayashi || HNS || align=right | 5.4 km || 
|-id=581 bgcolor=#E9E9E9
| 17581 ||  || — || November 4, 1994 || Oizumi || T. Kobayashi || — || align=right | 4.5 km || 
|-id=582 bgcolor=#fefefe
| 17582 || 1994 WL || — || November 25, 1994 || Oizumi || T. Kobayashi || V || align=right | 3.8 km || 
|-id=583 bgcolor=#fefefe
| 17583 ||  || — || November 30, 1994 || Oizumi || T. Kobayashi || FLO || align=right | 3.2 km || 
|-id=584 bgcolor=#fefefe
| 17584 ||  || — || December 6, 1994 || Oizumi || T. Kobayashi || — || align=right | 5.3 km || 
|-id=585 bgcolor=#fefefe
| 17585 ||  || — || December 31, 1994 || Kitt Peak || Spacewatch || NYS || align=right | 3.5 km || 
|-id=586 bgcolor=#fefefe
| 17586 ||  || — || January 10, 1995 || Oizumi || T. Kobayashi || — || align=right | 2.3 km || 
|-id=587 bgcolor=#d6d6d6
| 17587 || 1995 BD || — || January 20, 1995 || Oizumi || T. Kobayashi || 7:4 || align=right | 19 km || 
|-id=588 bgcolor=#fefefe
| 17588 ||  || — || January 30, 1995 || Oizumi || T. Kobayashi || — || align=right | 2.6 km || 
|-id=589 bgcolor=#fefefe
| 17589 ||  || — || January 29, 1995 || Kitt Peak || Spacewatch || V || align=right | 2.6 km || 
|-id=590 bgcolor=#fefefe
| 17590 || 1995 CG || — || February 1, 1995 || Oizumi || T. Kobayashi || H || align=right | 2.5 km || 
|-id=591 bgcolor=#d6d6d6
| 17591 || 1995 DG || — || February 20, 1995 || Oizumi || T. Kobayashi || TIR || align=right | 8.6 km || 
|-id=592 bgcolor=#fefefe
| 17592 || 1995 DR || — || February 22, 1995 || Oizumi || T. Kobayashi || — || align=right | 6.2 km || 
|-id=593 bgcolor=#fefefe
| 17593 || 1995 DV || — || February 20, 1995 || Oizumi || T. Kobayashi || — || align=right | 3.1 km || 
|-id=594 bgcolor=#d6d6d6
| 17594 ||  || — || February 23, 1995 || Kitt Peak || Spacewatch || — || align=right | 6.6 km || 
|-id=595 bgcolor=#fefefe
| 17595 || 1995 EO || — || March 1, 1995 || Kleť || Kleť Obs. || FLO || align=right | 2.7 km || 
|-id=596 bgcolor=#d6d6d6
| 17596 ||  || — || March 11, 1995 || Oizumi || T. Kobayashi || ITH || align=right | 6.3 km || 
|-id=597 bgcolor=#fefefe
| 17597 Stefanzweig ||  ||  || March 4, 1995 || Tautenburg Observatory || F. Börngen || — || align=right | 5.1 km || 
|-id=598 bgcolor=#fefefe
| 17598 ||  || — || May 23, 1995 || Kiyosato || S. Otomo || — || align=right | 4.9 km || 
|-id=599 bgcolor=#E9E9E9
| 17599 ||  || — || July 22, 1995 || Kitt Peak || Spacewatch || — || align=right | 3.3 km || 
|-id=600 bgcolor=#d6d6d6
| 17600 Dobřichovice || 1995 SO ||  || September 18, 1995 || Ondřejov || L. Kotková || — || align=right | 4.1 km || 
|}

17601–17700 

|-bgcolor=#fefefe
| 17601 Sheldonschafer || 1995 SS ||  || September 19, 1995 || Catalina Station || T. B. Spahr || H || align=right | 2.5 km || 
|-id=602 bgcolor=#d6d6d6
| 17602 Dr. G. ||  ||  || September 19, 1995 || Catalina Station || T. B. Spahr || — || align=right | 9.9 km || 
|-id=603 bgcolor=#E9E9E9
| 17603 Qoyllurwasi ||  ||  || September 20, 1995 || Kitami || K. Endate, K. Watanabe || — || align=right | 11 km || 
|-id=604 bgcolor=#d6d6d6
| 17604 ||  || — || September 19, 1995 || Kitt Peak || Spacewatch || EOS || align=right | 5.9 km || 
|-id=605 bgcolor=#d6d6d6
| 17605 ||  || — || September 19, 1995 || Kitt Peak || Spacewatch || KOR || align=right | 5.3 km || 
|-id=606 bgcolor=#E9E9E9
| 17606 Wumengchao ||  ||  || September 28, 1995 || Xinglong || SCAP || — || align=right | 8.3 km || 
|-id=607 bgcolor=#d6d6d6
| 17607 Táborsko || 1995 TC ||  || October 2, 1995 || Kleť || M. Tichý, Z. Moravec || KOR || align=right | 5.0 km || 
|-id=608 bgcolor=#d6d6d6
| 17608 Terezín || 1995 TN ||  || October 12, 1995 || Kleť || M. Tichý || — || align=right | 6.6 km || 
|-id=609 bgcolor=#fefefe
| 17609 || 1995 UR || — || October 18, 1995 || Catalina Station || T. B. Spahr || PHO || align=right | 3.9 km || 
|-id=610 bgcolor=#d6d6d6
| 17610 ||  || — || October 23, 1995 || Sudbury || D. di Cicco || EOS || align=right | 9.0 km || 
|-id=611 bgcolor=#d6d6d6
| 17611 Jožkakubík ||  ||  || October 24, 1995 || Kleť || Kleť Obs. || EOS || align=right | 8.2 km || 
|-id=612 bgcolor=#d6d6d6
| 17612 Whiteknight ||  ||  || October 20, 1995 || Chichibu || N. Satō, T. Urata || — || align=right | 4.9 km || 
|-id=613 bgcolor=#E9E9E9
| 17613 ||  || — || October 27, 1995 || Kushiro || S. Ueda, H. Kaneda || — || align=right | 5.1 km || 
|-id=614 bgcolor=#d6d6d6
| 17614 ||  || — || October 27, 1995 || Sormano || P. Sicoli, P. Chiavenna || — || align=right | 5.4 km || 
|-id=615 bgcolor=#d6d6d6
| 17615 Takeomasaru ||  ||  || October 30, 1995 || Kitami || K. Endate, K. Watanabe || — || align=right | 14 km || 
|-id=616 bgcolor=#d6d6d6
| 17616 ||  || — || October 17, 1995 || Kitt Peak || Spacewatch || HYG || align=right | 7.4 km || 
|-id=617 bgcolor=#d6d6d6
| 17617 Takimotoikuo ||  ||  || October 28, 1995 || Kitami || K. Endate, K. Watanabe || — || align=right | 11 km || 
|-id=618 bgcolor=#d6d6d6
| 17618 || 1995 VO || — || November 4, 1995 || Oizumi || T. Kobayashi || EOS || align=right | 9.1 km || 
|-id=619 bgcolor=#d6d6d6
| 17619 || 1995 VT || — || November 1, 1995 || Kiyosato || S. Otomo || EOS || align=right | 11 km || 
|-id=620 bgcolor=#d6d6d6
| 17620 || 1995 WY || — || November 18, 1995 || Oizumi || T. Kobayashi || EOS || align=right | 9.2 km || 
|-id=621 bgcolor=#d6d6d6
| 17621 ||  || — || November 16, 1995 || Kushiro || S. Ueda, H. Kaneda || — || align=right | 7.7 km || 
|-id=622 bgcolor=#d6d6d6
| 17622 ||  || — || November 20, 1995 || Oizumi || T. Kobayashi || — || align=right | 6.5 km || 
|-id=623 bgcolor=#d6d6d6
| 17623 ||  || — || November 30, 1995 || Xinglong || SCAP || — || align=right | 13 km || 
|-id=624 bgcolor=#fefefe
| 17624 || 1996 AT || — || January 10, 1996 || Oizumi || T. Kobayashi || — || align=right | 2.8 km || 
|-id=625 bgcolor=#d6d6d6
| 17625 Joseflada ||  ||  || January 14, 1996 || Ondřejov || P. Pravec, L. Kotková || — || align=right | 8.0 km || 
|-id=626 bgcolor=#d6d6d6
| 17626 ||  || — || January 12, 1996 || Kushiro || S. Ueda, H. Kaneda || — || align=right | 18 km || 
|-id=627 bgcolor=#d6d6d6
| 17627 Humptydumpty ||  ||  || January 27, 1996 || Oohira || T. Urata || THM || align=right | 12 km || 
|-id=628 bgcolor=#FA8072
| 17628 ||  || — || March 21, 1996 || Socorro || Lincoln Lab ETS || — || align=right | 2.6 km || 
|-id=629 bgcolor=#fefefe
| 17629 Koichisuzuki ||  ||  || April 21, 1996 || Nanyo || T. Okuni || V || align=right | 2.3 km || 
|-id=630 bgcolor=#fefefe
| 17630 ||  || — || April 18, 1996 || La Silla || E. W. Elst || FLO || align=right | 1.8 km || 
|-id=631 bgcolor=#fefefe
| 17631 ||  || — || April 21, 1996 || Haleakala || NEAT || FLO || align=right | 2.2 km || 
|-id=632 bgcolor=#fefefe
| 17632 ||  || — || April 21, 1996 || Haleakala || NEAT || NYS || align=right | 3.2 km || 
|-id=633 bgcolor=#fefefe
| 17633 || 1996 JU || — || May 11, 1996 || Catalina Station || T. B. Spahr || PHO || align=right | 4.5 km || 
|-id=634 bgcolor=#fefefe
| 17634 ||  || — || July 14, 1996 || La Silla || E. W. Elst || NYS || align=right | 2.8 km || 
|-id=635 bgcolor=#fefefe
| 17635 ||  || — || July 20, 1996 || Xinglong || SCAP || — || align=right | 5.0 km || 
|-id=636 bgcolor=#fefefe
| 17636 || 1996 PQ || — || August 9, 1996 || Haleakala || NEAT || V || align=right | 2.6 km || 
|-id=637 bgcolor=#fefefe
| 17637 Blaschke ||  ||  || August 11, 1996 || Prescott || P. G. Comba || V || align=right | 3.2 km || 
|-id=638 bgcolor=#fefefe
| 17638 Sualan ||  ||  || August 11, 1996 || Rand || G. R. Viscome || NYS || align=right | 2.2 km || 
|-id=639 bgcolor=#fefefe
| 17639 ||  || — || August 9, 1996 || Haleakala || NEAT || NYS || align=right | 2.9 km || 
|-id=640 bgcolor=#FA8072
| 17640 Mount Stromlo ||  ||  || August 15, 1996 || Macquarie || R. H. McNaught, J. B. Child || — || align=right | 3.8 km || 
|-id=641 bgcolor=#fefefe
| 17641 ||  || — || September 18, 1996 || Xinglong || SCAP || V || align=right | 3.2 km || 
|-id=642 bgcolor=#E9E9E9
| 17642 ||  || — || October 6, 1996 || Rand || G. R. Viscome || — || align=right | 4.2 km || 
|-id=643 bgcolor=#E9E9E9
| 17643 ||  || — || October 9, 1996 || Haleakala || NEAT || — || align=right | 3.5 km || 
|-id=644 bgcolor=#E9E9E9
| 17644 ||  || — || October 10, 1996 || Catalina Station || T. B. Spahr || HNS || align=right | 6.5 km || 
|-id=645 bgcolor=#d6d6d6
| 17645 Inarimori ||  ||  || October 9, 1996 || Nanyo || T. Okuni || slow || align=right | 6.4 km || 
|-id=646 bgcolor=#fefefe
| 17646 ||  || — || October 12, 1996 || Kitt Peak || Spacewatch || — || align=right | 3.9 km || 
|-id=647 bgcolor=#E9E9E9
| 17647 ||  || — || October 8, 1996 || La Silla || E. W. Elst || — || align=right | 4.4 km || 
|-id=648 bgcolor=#E9E9E9
| 17648 || 1996 UU || — || October 16, 1996 || Nachi-Katsuura || Y. Shimizu, T. Urata || EUN || align=right | 4.1 km || 
|-id=649 bgcolor=#E9E9E9
| 17649 Brunorossi ||  ||  || October 17, 1996 || Colleverde || V. S. Casulli || — || align=right | 4.9 km || 
|-id=650 bgcolor=#E9E9E9
| 17650 ||  || — || October 29, 1996 || Xinglong || SCAP || — || align=right | 4.4 km || 
|-id=651 bgcolor=#fefefe
| 17651 Tajimi ||  ||  || November 3, 1996 || Tajimi || T. Mizuno, T. Furuta || V || align=right | 4.4 km || 
|-id=652 bgcolor=#E9E9E9
| 17652 Nepoti ||  ||  || November 3, 1996 || Pianoro || V. Goretti || — || align=right | 10 km || 
|-id=653 bgcolor=#E9E9E9
| 17653 Bochner ||  ||  || November 10, 1996 || Prescott || P. G. Comba || ADE || align=right | 8.1 km || 
|-id=654 bgcolor=#E9E9E9
| 17654 ||  || — || November 6, 1996 || Oizumi || T. Kobayashi || — || align=right | 7.7 km || 
|-id=655 bgcolor=#E9E9E9
| 17655 ||  || — || November 6, 1996 || Oizumi || T. Kobayashi || — || align=right | 7.7 km || 
|-id=656 bgcolor=#E9E9E9
| 17656 Hayabusa ||  ||  || November 6, 1996 || Chichibu || N. Satō || — || align=right | 6.6 km || 
|-id=657 bgcolor=#fefefe
| 17657 Himawari ||  ||  || November 6, 1996 || Chichibu || N. Satō || H || align=right | 9.0 km || 
|-id=658 bgcolor=#E9E9E9
| 17658 ||  || — || November 13, 1996 || Oizumi || T. Kobayashi || — || align=right | 6.4 km || 
|-id=659 bgcolor=#E9E9E9
| 17659 ||  || — || November 15, 1996 || Oizumi || T. Kobayashi || — || align=right | 6.3 km || 
|-id=660 bgcolor=#E9E9E9
| 17660 ||  || — || November 7, 1996 || Church Stretton || S. P. Laurie || — || align=right | 4.1 km || 
|-id=661 bgcolor=#E9E9E9
| 17661 ||  || — || November 3, 1996 || Kushiro || S. Ueda, H. Kaneda || — || align=right | 7.5 km || 
|-id=662 bgcolor=#E9E9E9
| 17662 ||  || — || November 7, 1996 || Kushiro || S. Ueda, H. Kaneda || — || align=right | 9.1 km || 
|-id=663 bgcolor=#E9E9E9
| 17663 ||  || — || November 7, 1996 || Kushiro || S. Ueda, H. Kaneda || — || align=right | 4.2 km || 
|-id=664 bgcolor=#E9E9E9
| 17664 ||  || — || November 7, 1996 || Kushiro || S. Ueda, H. Kaneda || — || align=right | 5.3 km || 
|-id=665 bgcolor=#E9E9E9
| 17665 || 1996 WD || — || November 16, 1996 || Oizumi || T. Kobayashi || — || align=right | 5.6 km || 
|-id=666 bgcolor=#E9E9E9
| 17666 || 1996 XR || — || December 1, 1996 || Chichibu || N. Satō || — || align=right | 3.5 km || 
|-id=667 bgcolor=#d6d6d6
| 17667 ||  || — || December 7, 1996 || Oizumi || T. Kobayashi || EOS || align=right | 7.0 km || 
|-id=668 bgcolor=#d6d6d6
| 17668 ||  || — || December 7, 1996 || Oizumi || T. Kobayashi || — || align=right | 8.9 km || 
|-id=669 bgcolor=#d6d6d6
| 17669 ||  || — || December 7, 1996 || Oizumi || T. Kobayashi || — || align=right | 18 km || 
|-id=670 bgcolor=#E9E9E9
| 17670 Liddell ||  ||  || December 8, 1996 || Oohira || T. Urata || — || align=right | 7.0 km || 
|-id=671 bgcolor=#d6d6d6
| 17671 ||  || — || December 11, 1996 || Oizumi || T. Kobayashi || — || align=right | 5.8 km || 
|-id=672 bgcolor=#d6d6d6
| 17672 ||  || — || December 11, 1996 || Saji || Saji Obs. || — || align=right | 12 km || 
|-id=673 bgcolor=#d6d6d6
| 17673 Houkidaisen ||  ||  || December 15, 1996 || Saji || Saji Obs. || — || align=right | 6.6 km || 
|-id=674 bgcolor=#d6d6d6
| 17674 || 1996 YG || — || December 20, 1996 || Oizumi || T. Kobayashi || — || align=right | 8.9 km || 
|-id=675 bgcolor=#E9E9E9
| 17675 || 1996 YU || — || December 20, 1996 || Oizumi || T. Kobayashi || AGN || align=right | 4.3 km || 
|-id=676 bgcolor=#d6d6d6
| 17676 ||  || — || January 2, 1997 || Oizumi || T. Kobayashi || — || align=right | 11 km || 
|-id=677 bgcolor=#d6d6d6
| 17677 ||  || — || January 4, 1997 || Oizumi || T. Kobayashi || — || align=right | 11 km || 
|-id=678 bgcolor=#d6d6d6
| 17678 ||  || — || January 3, 1997 || Kitt Peak || Spacewatch || — || align=right | 6.1 km || 
|-id=679 bgcolor=#d6d6d6
| 17679 ||  || — || January 6, 1997 || Oizumi || T. Kobayashi || — || align=right | 10 km || 
|-id=680 bgcolor=#d6d6d6
| 17680 ||  || — || January 1, 1997 || Xinglong || SCAP || THM || align=right | 9.9 km || 
|-id=681 bgcolor=#fefefe
| 17681 Tweedledum ||  ||  || January 6, 1997 || Oohira || T. Urata || H || align=right | 2.4 km || 
|-id=682 bgcolor=#d6d6d6
| 17682 ||  || — || January 10, 1997 || Oizumi || T. Kobayashi || EOS || align=right | 7.6 km || 
|-id=683 bgcolor=#d6d6d6
| 17683 Kanagawa ||  ||  || January 10, 1997 || Hadano Obs. || A. Asami || — || align=right | 17 km || 
|-id=684 bgcolor=#d6d6d6
| 17684 ||  || — || January 14, 1997 || Oizumi || T. Kobayashi || — || align=right | 5.4 km || 
|-id=685 bgcolor=#E9E9E9
| 17685 ||  || — || January 13, 1997 || Nanyo || T. Okuni || — || align=right | 8.2 km || 
|-id=686 bgcolor=#d6d6d6
| 17686 ||  || — || January 29, 1997 || Oizumi || T. Kobayashi || EOS || align=right | 11 km || 
|-id=687 bgcolor=#d6d6d6
| 17687 ||  || — || January 30, 1997 || Oizumi || T. Kobayashi || EOS || align=right | 6.1 km || 
|-id=688 bgcolor=#E9E9E9
| 17688 ||  || — || January 31, 1997 || Oizumi || T. Kobayashi || DOR || align=right | 8.5 km || 
|-id=689 bgcolor=#d6d6d6
| 17689 || 1997 CS || — || February 1, 1997 || Oizumi || T. Kobayashi || slow || align=right | 9.4 km || 
|-id=690 bgcolor=#d6d6d6
| 17690 ||  || — || February 3, 1997 || Oizumi || T. Kobayashi || — || align=right | 9.8 km || 
|-id=691 bgcolor=#d6d6d6
| 17691 ||  || — || February 1, 1997 || Kitt Peak || Spacewatch || HYG || align=right | 8.9 km || 
|-id=692 bgcolor=#d6d6d6
| 17692 ||  || — || February 6, 1997 || Xinglong || SCAP || HYG || align=right | 10 km || 
|-id=693 bgcolor=#d6d6d6
| 17693 Wangdaheng ||  ||  || February 15, 1997 || Xinglong || SCAP || EOS || align=right | 6.0 km || 
|-id=694 bgcolor=#d6d6d6
| 17694 Jiránek ||  ||  || March 4, 1997 || Kleť || M. Tichý, Z. Moravec || KOR || align=right | 6.3 km || 
|-id=695 bgcolor=#d6d6d6
| 17695 ||  || — || March 3, 1997 || Kitt Peak || Spacewatch || — || align=right | 6.5 km || 
|-id=696 bgcolor=#d6d6d6
| 17696 Bombelli ||  ||  || March 8, 1997 || Prescott || P. G. Comba || EOS || align=right | 7.8 km || 
|-id=697 bgcolor=#d6d6d6
| 17697 Evanchen ||  ||  || March 10, 1997 || Socorro || LINEAR || EOS || align=right | 6.8 km || 
|-id=698 bgcolor=#d6d6d6
| 17698 Racheldavis ||  ||  || March 10, 1997 || Socorro || LINEAR || CRO || align=right | 12 km || 
|-id=699 bgcolor=#d6d6d6
| 17699 ||  || — || April 2, 1997 || Socorro || LINEAR || THM || align=right | 9.4 km || 
|-id=700 bgcolor=#fefefe
| 17700 Oleksiygolubov ||  ||  || April 7, 1997 || La Silla || E. W. Elst || moon || align=right | 3.4 km || 
|}

17701–17800 

|-bgcolor=#d6d6d6
| 17701 ||  || — || April 9, 1997 || La Silla || E. W. Elst || VER || align=right | 14 km || 
|-id=702 bgcolor=#d6d6d6
| 17702 Kryštofharant || 1997 JD ||  || May 1, 1997 || Ondřejov || P. Pravec || EOS || align=right | 6.6 km || 
|-id=703 bgcolor=#fefefe
| 17703 Bombieri ||  ||  || September 9, 1997 || Prescott || P. G. Comba || — || align=right | 1.7 km || 
|-id=704 bgcolor=#fefefe
| 17704 ||  || — || October 21, 1997 || Kitt Peak || Spacewatch || — || align=right | 2.3 km || 
|-id=705 bgcolor=#fefefe
| 17705 ||  || — || October 28, 1997 || Xinglong || SCAP || V || align=right | 4.3 km || 
|-id=706 bgcolor=#fefefe
| 17706 ||  || — || November 9, 1997 || Oizumi || T. Kobayashi || — || align=right | 3.4 km || 
|-id=707 bgcolor=#fefefe
| 17707 ||  || — || November 2, 1997 || Xinglong || SCAP || FLO || align=right | 2.8 km || 
|-id=708 bgcolor=#fefefe
| 17708 || 1997 WB || — || November 18, 1997 || Woomera || F. B. Zoltowski || V || align=right | 1.7 km || 
|-id=709 bgcolor=#fefefe
| 17709 ||  || — || November 19, 1997 || Oizumi || T. Kobayashi || FLO || align=right | 2.7 km || 
|-id=710 bgcolor=#fefefe
| 17710 ||  || — || November 23, 1997 || Oizumi || T. Kobayashi || V || align=right | 2.4 km || 
|-id=711 bgcolor=#E9E9E9
| 17711 ||  || — || November 23, 1997 || Kitt Peak || Spacewatch || — || align=right | 9.1 km || 
|-id=712 bgcolor=#fefefe
| 17712 Fatherwilliam ||  ||  || November 19, 1997 || Nachi-Katsuura || Y. Shimizu, T. Urata || FLO || align=right | 4.4 km || 
|-id=713 bgcolor=#fefefe
| 17713 ||  || — || November 25, 1997 || Kitt Peak || Spacewatch || — || align=right | 2.6 km || 
|-id=714 bgcolor=#fefefe
| 17714 ||  || — || November 29, 1997 || Socorro || LINEAR || FLO || align=right | 3.2 km || 
|-id=715 bgcolor=#fefefe
| 17715 ||  || — || November 29, 1997 || Socorro || LINEAR || — || align=right | 3.6 km || 
|-id=716 bgcolor=#fefefe
| 17716 ||  || — || November 29, 1997 || Socorro || LINEAR || — || align=right | 2.1 km || 
|-id=717 bgcolor=#fefefe
| 17717 || 1997 XL || — || December 3, 1997 || Oizumi || T. Kobayashi || FLO || align=right | 3.4 km || 
|-id=718 bgcolor=#fefefe
| 17718 || 1997 XZ || — || December 3, 1997 || Oizumi || T. Kobayashi || NYS || align=right | 5.7 km || 
|-id=719 bgcolor=#fefefe
| 17719 ||  || — || December 2, 1997 || Nachi-Katsuura || Y. Shimizu, T. Urata || V || align=right | 2.4 km || 
|-id=720 bgcolor=#fefefe
| 17720 Manuboccuni ||  ||  || December 7, 1997 || Cima Ekar || M. Tombelli || FLO || align=right | 3.6 km || 
|-id=721 bgcolor=#d6d6d6
| 17721 ||  || — || December 10, 1997 || Xinglong || SCAP || — || align=right | 6.3 km || 
|-id=722 bgcolor=#fefefe
| 17722 ||  || — || December 21, 1997 || Xinglong || SCAP || — || align=right | 5.3 km || 
|-id=723 bgcolor=#fefefe
| 17723 ||  || — || December 22, 1997 || Xinglong || SCAP || FLO || align=right | 2.5 km || 
|-id=724 bgcolor=#fefefe
| 17724 ||  || — || December 25, 1997 || Oizumi || T. Kobayashi || — || align=right | 2.0 km || 
|-id=725 bgcolor=#E9E9E9
| 17725 ||  || — || December 27, 1997 || Oizumi || T. Kobayashi || EUN || align=right | 6.4 km || 
|-id=726 bgcolor=#fefefe
| 17726 ||  || — || December 22, 1997 || Xinglong || SCAP || — || align=right | 3.9 km || 
|-id=727 bgcolor=#fefefe
| 17727 ||  || — || December 30, 1997 || Oizumi || T. Kobayashi || V || align=right | 3.8 km || 
|-id=728 bgcolor=#fefefe
| 17728 ||  || — || December 21, 1997 || Kitt Peak || Spacewatch || NYS || align=right | 5.7 km || 
|-id=729 bgcolor=#fefefe
| 17729 ||  || — || December 28, 1997 || Kitt Peak || Spacewatch || — || align=right | 3.7 km || 
|-id=730 bgcolor=#fefefe
| 17730 ||  || — || January 6, 1998 || Kitt Peak || Spacewatch || — || align=right | 6.9 km || 
|-id=731 bgcolor=#fefefe
| 17731 ||  || — || January 15, 1998 || Caussols || ODAS || — || align=right | 2.1 km || 
|-id=732 bgcolor=#E9E9E9
| 17732 ||  || — || January 1, 1998 || Kitt Peak || Spacewatch || — || align=right | 3.3 km || 
|-id=733 bgcolor=#fefefe
| 17733 ||  || — || January 19, 1998 || Oizumi || T. Kobayashi || — || align=right | 11 km || 
|-id=734 bgcolor=#fefefe
| 17734 Boole ||  ||  || January 22, 1998 || Prescott || P. G. Comba || — || align=right | 4.0 km || 
|-id=735 bgcolor=#fefefe
| 17735 ||  || — || January 24, 1998 || Haleakala || NEAT || FLO || align=right | 2.8 km || 
|-id=736 bgcolor=#E9E9E9
| 17736 ||  || — || January 23, 1998 || Socorro || LINEAR || — || align=right | 8.6 km || 
|-id=737 bgcolor=#fefefe
| 17737 Sigmundjähn ||  ||  || January 27, 1998 || Drebach || J. Kandler || — || align=right | 5.2 km || 
|-id=738 bgcolor=#fefefe
| 17738 ||  || — || January 24, 1998 || Haleakala || NEAT || — || align=right | 6.1 km || 
|-id=739 bgcolor=#fefefe
| 17739 ||  || — || January 25, 1998 || Haleakala || NEAT || — || align=right | 4.9 km || 
|-id=740 bgcolor=#E9E9E9
| 17740 ||  || — || January 27, 1998 || Sormano || A. Testa, P. Ghezzi || — || align=right | 7.3 km || 
|-id=741 bgcolor=#d6d6d6
| 17741 ||  || — || January 26, 1998 || Kitt Peak || Spacewatch || — || align=right | 3.6 km || 
|-id=742 bgcolor=#d6d6d6
| 17742 ||  || — || January 28, 1998 || Oizumi || T. Kobayashi || — || align=right | 12 km || 
|-id=743 bgcolor=#fefefe
| 17743 ||  || — || January 26, 1998 || Kitt Peak || Spacewatch || — || align=right | 2.7 km || 
|-id=744 bgcolor=#FA8072
| 17744 Jodiefoster ||  ||  || January 18, 1998 || Caussols || ODAS || — || align=right | 2.1 km || 
|-id=745 bgcolor=#d6d6d6
| 17745 ||  || — || January 22, 1998 || Kitt Peak || Spacewatch || — || align=right | 4.2 km || 
|-id=746 bgcolor=#fefefe
| 17746 Haigha ||  ||  || January 30, 1998 || Gekko || T. Kagawa, T. Urata || — || align=right | 4.5 km || 
|-id=747 bgcolor=#fefefe
| 17747 ||  || — || January 26, 1998 || Xinglong || SCAP || NYS || align=right | 2.0 km || 
|-id=748 bgcolor=#fefefe
| 17748 Uedashoji || 1998 CL ||  || February 1, 1998 || Saji || Saji Obs. || — || align=right | 2.5 km || 
|-id=749 bgcolor=#fefefe
| 17749 Dulbecco ||  ||  || February 19, 1998 || Farra d'Isonzo || Farra d'Isonzo || — || align=right | 4.8 km || 
|-id=750 bgcolor=#E9E9E9
| 17750 ||  || — || February 18, 1998 || Woomera || F. B. Zoltowski || — || align=right | 6.3 km || 
|-id=751 bgcolor=#E9E9E9
| 17751 ||  || — || February 22, 1998 || Haleakala || NEAT || — || align=right | 13 km || 
|-id=752 bgcolor=#E9E9E9
| 17752 ||  || — || February 22, 1998 || Haleakala || NEAT || — || align=right | 4.1 km || 
|-id=753 bgcolor=#E9E9E9
| 17753 ||  || — || February 22, 1998 || Haleakala || NEAT || — || align=right | 4.0 km || 
|-id=754 bgcolor=#d6d6d6
| 17754 ||  || — || February 21, 1998 || Xinglong || SCAP || EMA || align=right | 14 km || 
|-id=755 bgcolor=#d6d6d6
| 17755 ||  || — || February 24, 1998 || Haleakala || NEAT || THM || align=right | 11 km || 
|-id=756 bgcolor=#E9E9E9
| 17756 ||  || — || February 25, 1998 || Haleakala || NEAT || — || align=right | 4.9 km || 
|-id=757 bgcolor=#E9E9E9
| 17757 ||  || — || February 22, 1998 || Haleakala || NEAT || — || align=right | 5.8 km || 
|-id=758 bgcolor=#E9E9E9
| 17758 ||  || — || February 23, 1998 || Kitt Peak || Spacewatch || AGN || align=right | 4.4 km || 
|-id=759 bgcolor=#E9E9E9
| 17759 Hatta ||  ||  || February 17, 1998 || Nachi-Katsuura || Y. Shimizu, T. Urata || — || align=right | 5.4 km || 
|-id=760 bgcolor=#fefefe
| 17760 ||  || — || February 27, 1998 || La Silla || E. W. Elst || MAS || align=right | 3.0 km || 
|-id=761 bgcolor=#E9E9E9
| 17761 ||  || — || February 27, 1998 || La Silla || E. W. Elst || — || align=right | 6.8 km || 
|-id=762 bgcolor=#d6d6d6
| 17762 ||  || — || February 27, 1998 || La Silla || E. W. Elst || KOR || align=right | 6.0 km || 
|-id=763 bgcolor=#E9E9E9
| 17763 || 1998 EG || — || March 1, 1998 || Caussols || ODAS || — || align=right | 4.4 km || 
|-id=764 bgcolor=#E9E9E9
| 17764 Schatzman ||  ||  || March 2, 1998 || Caussols || ODAS || — || align=right | 4.0 km || 
|-id=765 bgcolor=#E9E9E9
| 17765 ||  || — || March 1, 1998 || Xinglong || SCAP || — || align=right | 4.9 km || 
|-id=766 bgcolor=#E9E9E9
| 17766 ||  || — || March 2, 1998 || Oizumi || T. Kobayashi || EUN || align=right | 5.8 km || 
|-id=767 bgcolor=#fefefe
| 17767 ||  || — || March 1, 1998 || Caussols || ODAS || — || align=right | 7.2 km || 
|-id=768 bgcolor=#d6d6d6
| 17768 Tigerlily ||  ||  || March 3, 1998 || Oohira || T. Urata || TEL || align=right | 5.6 km || 
|-id=769 bgcolor=#fefefe
| 17769 ||  || — || March 15, 1998 || Oizumi || T. Kobayashi || V || align=right | 3.1 km || 
|-id=770 bgcolor=#E9E9E9
| 17770 Baumé ||  ||  || March 1, 1998 || La Silla || E. W. Elst || — || align=right | 5.7 km || 
|-id=771 bgcolor=#d6d6d6
| 17771 Elsheimer ||  ||  || March 1, 1998 || La Silla || E. W. Elst || THM || align=right | 8.7 km || 
|-id=772 bgcolor=#d6d6d6
| 17772 ||  || — || March 1, 1998 || La Silla || E. W. Elst || KOR || align=right | 6.7 km || 
|-id=773 bgcolor=#d6d6d6
| 17773 ||  || — || March 1, 1998 || La Silla || E. W. Elst || — || align=right | 15 km || 
|-id=774 bgcolor=#fefefe
| 17774 ||  || — || March 1, 1998 || La Silla || E. W. Elst || — || align=right | 3.5 km || 
|-id=775 bgcolor=#E9E9E9
| 17775 || 1998 FH || — || March 18, 1998 || Woomera || F. B. Zoltowski || — || align=right | 6.7 km || 
|-id=776 bgcolor=#fefefe
| 17776 Troska ||  ||  || March 22, 1998 || Ondřejov || P. Pravec || — || align=right | 4.7 km || 
|-id=777 bgcolor=#fefefe
| 17777 Ornicar ||  ||  || March 24, 1998 || Caussols || ODAS || — || align=right | 3.3 km || 
|-id=778 bgcolor=#E9E9E9
| 17778 ||  || — || March 24, 1998 || Haleakala || NEAT || — || align=right | 5.3 km || 
|-id=779 bgcolor=#d6d6d6
| 17779 Migomueller ||  ||  || March 26, 1998 || Caussols || ODAS || KOR || align=right | 6.7 km || 
|-id=780 bgcolor=#d6d6d6
| 17780 ||  || — || March 24, 1998 || Haleakala || NEAT || EOS || align=right | 8.8 km || 
|-id=781 bgcolor=#fefefe
| 17781 Kepping ||  ||  || March 20, 1998 || Socorro || LINEAR || — || align=right | 3.5 km || 
|-id=782 bgcolor=#E9E9E9
| 17782 ||  || — || March 20, 1998 || Socorro || LINEAR || — || align=right | 4.6 km || 
|-id=783 bgcolor=#E9E9E9
| 17783 ||  || — || March 20, 1998 || Socorro || LINEAR || — || align=right | 4.9 km || 
|-id=784 bgcolor=#fefefe
| 17784 Banerjee ||  ||  || March 20, 1998 || Socorro || LINEAR || — || align=right | 3.1 km || 
|-id=785 bgcolor=#fefefe
| 17785 Wesleyfuller ||  ||  || March 20, 1998 || Socorro || LINEAR || FLO || align=right | 2.8 km || 
|-id=786 bgcolor=#E9E9E9
| 17786 ||  || — || March 20, 1998 || Socorro || LINEAR || — || align=right | 16 km || 
|-id=787 bgcolor=#d6d6d6
| 17787 ||  || — || March 20, 1998 || Socorro || LINEAR || HYG || align=right | 7.3 km || 
|-id=788 bgcolor=#d6d6d6
| 17788 ||  || — || March 20, 1998 || Socorro || LINEAR || EOS || align=right | 8.7 km || 
|-id=789 bgcolor=#E9E9E9
| 17789 ||  || — || March 20, 1998 || Socorro || LINEAR || — || align=right | 5.1 km || 
|-id=790 bgcolor=#d6d6d6
| 17790 ||  || — || March 20, 1998 || Socorro || LINEAR || — || align=right | 11 km || 
|-id=791 bgcolor=#fefefe
| 17791 ||  || — || March 20, 1998 || Socorro || LINEAR || — || align=right | 5.7 km || 
|-id=792 bgcolor=#E9E9E9
| 17792 ||  || — || March 20, 1998 || Socorro || LINEAR || GER || align=right | 9.5 km || 
|-id=793 bgcolor=#E9E9E9
| 17793 ||  || — || March 20, 1998 || Socorro || LINEAR || — || align=right | 5.4 km || 
|-id=794 bgcolor=#d6d6d6
| 17794 Kowalinski ||  ||  || March 20, 1998 || Socorro || LINEAR || KOR || align=right | 4.6 km || 
|-id=795 bgcolor=#fefefe
| 17795 Elysiasegal ||  ||  || March 20, 1998 || Socorro || LINEAR || NYS || align=right | 3.0 km || 
|-id=796 bgcolor=#E9E9E9
| 17796 ||  || — || March 20, 1998 || Socorro || LINEAR || WAT || align=right | 9.8 km || 
|-id=797 bgcolor=#E9E9E9
| 17797 ||  || — || March 20, 1998 || Socorro || LINEAR || — || align=right | 12 km || 
|-id=798 bgcolor=#d6d6d6
| 17798 ||  || — || March 20, 1998 || Socorro || LINEAR || — || align=right | 12 km || 
|-id=799 bgcolor=#E9E9E9
| 17799 Petewilliams ||  ||  || March 20, 1998 || Socorro || LINEAR || NEM || align=right | 9.0 km || 
|-id=800 bgcolor=#d6d6d6
| 17800 ||  || — || March 20, 1998 || Socorro || LINEAR || — || align=right | 9.9 km || 
|}

17801–17900 

|-bgcolor=#d6d6d6
| 17801 Zelkowitz ||  ||  || March 20, 1998 || Socorro || LINEAR || THM || align=right | 8.1 km || 
|-id=802 bgcolor=#d6d6d6
| 17802 ||  || — || March 20, 1998 || Socorro || LINEAR || — || align=right | 16 km || 
|-id=803 bgcolor=#fefefe
| 17803 Barish ||  ||  || March 20, 1998 || Socorro || LINEAR || — || align=right | 3.0 km || 
|-id=804 bgcolor=#d6d6d6
| 17804 ||  || — || March 20, 1998 || Socorro || LINEAR || EOS || align=right | 8.4 km || 
|-id=805 bgcolor=#d6d6d6
| 17805 Švestka ||  ||  || March 30, 1998 || Kleť || M. Tichý, Z. Moravec || EOS || align=right | 6.0 km || 
|-id=806 bgcolor=#fefefe
| 17806 Adolfborn ||  ||  || March 31, 1998 || Ondřejov || P. Pravec || FLO || align=right | 2.5 km || 
|-id=807 bgcolor=#E9E9E9
| 17807 Ericpearce ||  ||  || March 19, 1998 || Anderson Mesa || LONEOS || — || align=right | 15 km || 
|-id=808 bgcolor=#d6d6d6
| 17808 ||  || — || March 24, 1998 || Socorro || LINEAR || EOS || align=right | 6.1 km || 
|-id=809 bgcolor=#d6d6d6
| 17809 ||  || — || March 24, 1998 || Socorro || LINEAR || — || align=right | 16 km || 
|-id=810 bgcolor=#E9E9E9
| 17810 ||  || — || March 31, 1998 || Socorro || LINEAR || — || align=right | 7.0 km || 
|-id=811 bgcolor=#E9E9E9
| 17811 ||  || — || March 31, 1998 || Socorro || LINEAR || — || align=right | 12 km || 
|-id=812 bgcolor=#d6d6d6
| 17812 ||  || — || March 31, 1998 || Socorro || LINEAR || URS || align=right | 14 km || 
|-id=813 bgcolor=#d6d6d6
| 17813 ||  || — || March 31, 1998 || Socorro || LINEAR || EOS || align=right | 7.1 km || 
|-id=814 bgcolor=#d6d6d6
| 17814 ||  || — || March 31, 1998 || Socorro || LINEAR || EOS || align=right | 13 km || 
|-id=815 bgcolor=#fefefe
| 17815 Kulawik ||  ||  || March 31, 1998 || Socorro || LINEAR || V || align=right | 2.5 km || 
|-id=816 bgcolor=#d6d6d6
| 17816 ||  || — || March 31, 1998 || Socorro || LINEAR || — || align=right | 14 km || 
|-id=817 bgcolor=#d6d6d6
| 17817 ||  || — || March 31, 1998 || Socorro || LINEAR || EOS || align=right | 10 km || 
|-id=818 bgcolor=#E9E9E9
| 17818 ||  || — || March 31, 1998 || Socorro || LINEAR || — || align=right | 7.5 km || 
|-id=819 bgcolor=#d6d6d6
| 17819 ||  || — || March 31, 1998 || Socorro || LINEAR || — || align=right | 9.4 km || 
|-id=820 bgcolor=#d6d6d6
| 17820 ||  || — || March 31, 1998 || Socorro || LINEAR || — || align=right | 7.7 km || 
|-id=821 bgcolor=#fefefe
| 17821 Bölsche ||  ||  || March 31, 1998 || Drebach || A. Knöfel, J. Kandler || V || align=right | 2.1 km || 
|-id=822 bgcolor=#d6d6d6
| 17822 ||  || — || March 22, 1998 || Socorro || LINEAR || HYG || align=right | 11 km || 
|-id=823 bgcolor=#fefefe
| 17823 Bartels || 1998 GA ||  || April 1, 1998 || Oaxaca || J. M. Roe || — || align=right | 5.5 km || 
|-id=824 bgcolor=#fefefe
| 17824 || 1998 GF || — || April 2, 1998 || Socorro || LINEAR || H || align=right | 2.1 km || 
|-id=825 bgcolor=#d6d6d6
| 17825 ||  || — || April 2, 1998 || Socorro || LINEAR || — || align=right | 13 km || 
|-id=826 bgcolor=#d6d6d6
| 17826 Normanwisdom ||  ||  || April 3, 1998 || Reedy Creek || J. Broughton || — || align=right | 8.0 km || 
|-id=827 bgcolor=#E9E9E9
| 17827 || 1998 HW || — || April 17, 1998 || Kitt Peak || Spacewatch || — || align=right | 6.2 km || 
|-id=828 bgcolor=#d6d6d6
| 17828 ||  || — || April 22, 1998 || Woomera || F. B. Zoltowski || — || align=right | 4.4 km || 
|-id=829 bgcolor=#d6d6d6
| 17829 ||  || — || April 20, 1998 || Socorro || LINEAR || — || align=right | 11 km || 
|-id=830 bgcolor=#d6d6d6
| 17830 ||  || — || April 20, 1998 || Socorro || LINEAR || KOR || align=right | 6.2 km || 
|-id=831 bgcolor=#E9E9E9
| 17831 Ussery ||  ||  || April 20, 1998 || Socorro || LINEAR || — || align=right | 4.2 km || 
|-id=832 bgcolor=#d6d6d6
| 17832 Pitman ||  ||  || April 20, 1998 || Socorro || LINEAR || — || align=right | 4.9 km || 
|-id=833 bgcolor=#E9E9E9
| 17833 ||  || — || April 23, 1998 || Haleakala || NEAT || GEF || align=right | 5.9 km || 
|-id=834 bgcolor=#d6d6d6
| 17834 ||  || — || April 25, 1998 || Višnjan Observatory || Višnjan Obs. || EOS || align=right | 8.6 km || 
|-id=835 bgcolor=#fefefe
| 17835 Anoelsuri ||  ||  || April 20, 1998 || Socorro || LINEAR || NYS || align=right | 3.4 km || 
|-id=836 bgcolor=#E9E9E9
| 17836 Canup ||  ||  || April 25, 1998 || Anderson Mesa || LONEOS || EUN || align=right | 4.4 km || 
|-id=837 bgcolor=#d6d6d6
| 17837 ||  || — || April 21, 1998 || Socorro || LINEAR || — || align=right | 7.9 km || 
|-id=838 bgcolor=#d6d6d6
| 17838 ||  || — || April 21, 1998 || Socorro || LINEAR || URS || align=right | 15 km || 
|-id=839 bgcolor=#d6d6d6
| 17839 ||  || — || April 21, 1998 || Socorro || LINEAR || — || align=right | 21 km || 
|-id=840 bgcolor=#d6d6d6
| 17840 ||  || — || April 21, 1998 || Socorro || LINEAR || LUT || align=right | 18 km || 
|-id=841 bgcolor=#E9E9E9
| 17841 ||  || — || April 21, 1998 || Socorro || LINEAR || — || align=right | 5.4 km || 
|-id=842 bgcolor=#E9E9E9
| 17842 Jorgegarcia ||  ||  || April 21, 1998 || Socorro || LINEAR || — || align=right | 4.7 km || 
|-id=843 bgcolor=#d6d6d6
| 17843 ||  || — || April 21, 1998 || Socorro || LINEAR || THM || align=right | 11 km || 
|-id=844 bgcolor=#d6d6d6
| 17844 Judson ||  ||  || April 21, 1998 || Socorro || LINEAR || KOR || align=right | 5.7 km || 
|-id=845 bgcolor=#d6d6d6
| 17845 ||  || — || April 23, 1998 || Socorro || LINEAR || — || align=right | 10 km || 
|-id=846 bgcolor=#E9E9E9
| 17846 ||  || — || April 23, 1998 || Socorro || LINEAR || — || align=right | 6.9 km || 
|-id=847 bgcolor=#E9E9E9
| 17847 ||  || — || April 23, 1998 || Socorro || LINEAR || slow || align=right | 5.4 km || 
|-id=848 bgcolor=#d6d6d6
| 17848 ||  || — || April 19, 1998 || Socorro || LINEAR || HYG || align=right | 9.1 km || 
|-id=849 bgcolor=#d6d6d6
| 17849 ||  || — || April 19, 1998 || Socorro || LINEAR || — || align=right | 16 km || 
|-id=850 bgcolor=#E9E9E9
| 17850 ||  || — || April 20, 1998 || Kitt Peak || Spacewatch || EUN || align=right | 5.0 km || 
|-id=851 bgcolor=#fefefe
| 17851 Kaler || 1998 JK ||  || May 1, 1998 || Haleakala || NEAT || NYS || align=right | 4.9 km || 
|-id=852 bgcolor=#fefefe
| 17852 ||  || — || May 1, 1998 || Haleakala || NEAT || — || align=right | 3.9 km || 
|-id=853 bgcolor=#d6d6d6
| 17853 Ronaldsayer ||  ||  || May 1, 1998 || Anderson Mesa || LONEOS || HYG || align=right | 12 km || 
|-id=854 bgcolor=#d6d6d6
| 17854 ||  || — || May 5, 1998 || Woomera || F. B. Zoltowski || EOS || align=right | 10 km || 
|-id=855 bgcolor=#d6d6d6
| 17855 Geffert || 1998 KK ||  || May 19, 1998 || Starkenburg Observatory || Starkenburg Obs. || — || align=right | 15 km || 
|-id=856 bgcolor=#E9E9E9
| 17856 Gomes ||  ||  || May 18, 1998 || Anderson Mesa || LONEOS || — || align=right | 3.9 km || 
|-id=857 bgcolor=#E9E9E9
| 17857 Hsieh ||  ||  || May 18, 1998 || Anderson Mesa || LONEOS || EUN || align=right | 6.5 km || 
|-id=858 bgcolor=#fefefe
| 17858 Beaugé ||  ||  || May 22, 1998 || Anderson Mesa || LONEOS || FLO || align=right | 2.9 km || 
|-id=859 bgcolor=#d6d6d6
| 17859 Galinaryabova ||  ||  || May 22, 1998 || Anderson Mesa || LONEOS || EOS || align=right | 13 km || 
|-id=860 bgcolor=#fefefe
| 17860 Roig ||  ||  || May 22, 1998 || Anderson Mesa || LONEOS || FLO || align=right | 3.7 km || 
|-id=861 bgcolor=#d6d6d6
| 17861 ||  || — || May 22, 1998 || Socorro || LINEAR || — || align=right | 17 km || 
|-id=862 bgcolor=#d6d6d6
| 17862 ||  || — || May 22, 1998 || Socorro || LINEAR || EOS || align=right | 8.7 km || 
|-id=863 bgcolor=#d6d6d6
| 17863 ||  || — || May 22, 1998 || Socorro || LINEAR || EOS || align=right | 9.3 km || 
|-id=864 bgcolor=#d6d6d6
| 17864 ||  || — || May 22, 1998 || Socorro || LINEAR || EOS || align=right | 10 km || 
|-id=865 bgcolor=#d6d6d6
| 17865 ||  || — || May 22, 1998 || Socorro || LINEAR || KOR || align=right | 5.8 km || 
|-id=866 bgcolor=#d6d6d6
| 17866 ||  || — || May 22, 1998 || Socorro || LINEAR || — || align=right | 15 km || 
|-id=867 bgcolor=#d6d6d6
| 17867 ||  || — || May 22, 1998 || Socorro || LINEAR || 3:2 || align=right | 19 km || 
|-id=868 bgcolor=#d6d6d6
| 17868 ||  || — || May 22, 1998 || Socorro || LINEAR || — || align=right | 15 km || 
|-id=869 bgcolor=#fefefe
| 17869 Descamps ||  ||  || June 20, 1998 || Caussols || ODAS || — || align=right | 2.6 km || 
|-id=870 bgcolor=#fefefe
| 17870 ||  || — || August 28, 1998 || Socorro || LINEAR || — || align=right | 4.1 km || 
|-id=871 bgcolor=#d6d6d6
| 17871 ||  || — || September 14, 1998 || Socorro || LINEAR || 7:4 || align=right | 24 km || 
|-id=872 bgcolor=#E9E9E9
| 17872 ||  || — || September 23, 1998 || Višnjan Observatory || Višnjan Obs. || — || align=right | 6.7 km || 
|-id=873 bgcolor=#fefefe
| 17873 ||  || — || December 11, 1998 || Mérida || O. A. Naranjo || — || align=right | 4.0 km || 
|-id=874 bgcolor=#C2FFFF
| 17874 ||  || — || December 17, 1998 || Oizumi || T. Kobayashi || L4 || align=right | 17 km || 
|-id=875 bgcolor=#fefefe
| 17875 ||  || — || January 9, 1999 || Oizumi || T. Kobayashi || FLO || align=right | 3.5 km || 
|-id=876 bgcolor=#fefefe
| 17876 ||  || — || January 15, 1999 || Višnjan Observatory || K. Korlević || — || align=right | 7.9 km || 
|-id=877 bgcolor=#fefefe
| 17877 ||  || — || January 15, 1999 || Oizumi || T. Kobayashi || V || align=right | 4.5 km || 
|-id=878 bgcolor=#fefefe
| 17878 ||  || — || January 15, 1999 || Caussols || ODAS || NYS || align=right | 2.8 km || 
|-id=879 bgcolor=#fefefe
| 17879 Robutel ||  ||  || January 22, 1999 || Caussols || ODAS || — || align=right | 2.6 km || 
|-id=880 bgcolor=#d6d6d6
| 17880 ||  || — || January 18, 1999 || Socorro || LINEAR || EOS || align=right | 6.7 km || 
|-id=881 bgcolor=#fefefe
| 17881 Radmall ||  ||  || February 10, 1999 || Socorro || LINEAR || — || align=right | 6.0 km || 
|-id=882 bgcolor=#fefefe
| 17882 Thielemann ||  ||  || February 10, 1999 || Socorro || LINEAR || — || align=right | 2.7 km || 
|-id=883 bgcolor=#fefefe
| 17883 Scobuchanan ||  ||  || February 12, 1999 || Socorro || LINEAR || FLO || align=right | 3.2 km || 
|-id=884 bgcolor=#fefefe
| 17884 Jeffthompson ||  ||  || February 12, 1999 || Socorro || LINEAR || — || align=right | 2.8 km || 
|-id=885 bgcolor=#E9E9E9
| 17885 Brianbeyt ||  ||  || February 12, 1999 || Socorro || LINEAR || RAF || align=right | 3.1 km || 
|-id=886 bgcolor=#fefefe
| 17886 ||  || — || February 12, 1999 || Socorro || LINEAR || — || align=right | 3.0 km || 
|-id=887 bgcolor=#fefefe
| 17887 ||  || — || February 17, 1999 || Caussols || ODAS || FLO || align=right | 2.3 km || 
|-id=888 bgcolor=#E9E9E9
| 17888 ||  || — || February 21, 1999 || Oizumi || T. Kobayashi || EUN || align=right | 5.1 km || 
|-id=889 bgcolor=#fefefe
| 17889 Liechty ||  ||  || February 20, 1999 || Socorro || LINEAR || — || align=right | 3.5 km || 
|-id=890 bgcolor=#E9E9E9
| 17890 ||  || — || February 20, 1999 || Socorro || LINEAR || — || align=right | 8.4 km || 
|-id=891 bgcolor=#E9E9E9
| 17891 Buraliforti || 1999 EA ||  || March 6, 1999 || Prescott || P. G. Comba || — || align=right | 3.9 km || 
|-id=892 bgcolor=#fefefe
| 17892 Morecambewise ||  ||  || March 15, 1999 || Reedy Creek || J. Broughton || FLO || align=right | 1.7 km || 
|-id=893 bgcolor=#fefefe
| 17893 Arlot || 1999 FO ||  || March 17, 1999 || Caussols || ODAS || FLO || align=right | 3.3 km || 
|-id=894 bgcolor=#E9E9E9
| 17894 || 1999 FP || — || March 17, 1999 || Caussols || ODAS || PAD || align=right | 9.8 km || 
|-id=895 bgcolor=#fefefe
| 17895 ||  || — || March 17, 1999 || Kitt Peak || Spacewatch || — || align=right | 2.5 km || 
|-id=896 bgcolor=#fefefe
| 17896 ||  || — || March 17, 1999 || Kitt Peak || Spacewatch || — || align=right | 3.2 km || 
|-id=897 bgcolor=#fefefe
| 17897 Gallardo ||  ||  || March 19, 1999 || Anderson Mesa || LONEOS || MAS || align=right | 2.9 km || 
|-id=898 bgcolor=#fefefe
| 17898 Scottsheppard ||  ||  || March 22, 1999 || Anderson Mesa || LONEOS || — || align=right | 3.4 km || 
|-id=899 bgcolor=#fefefe
| 17899 Mariacristina ||  ||  || March 22, 1999 || Anderson Mesa || LONEOS || FLO || align=right | 2.7 km || 
|-id=900 bgcolor=#fefefe
| 17900 Leiferman ||  ||  || March 19, 1999 || Socorro || LINEAR || — || align=right | 2.3 km || 
|}

17901–18000 

|-bgcolor=#E9E9E9
| 17901 ||  || — || March 19, 1999 || Socorro || LINEAR || — || align=right | 9.0 km || 
|-id=902 bgcolor=#fefefe
| 17902 Britbaker ||  ||  || March 19, 1999 || Socorro || LINEAR || — || align=right | 2.9 km || 
|-id=903 bgcolor=#E9E9E9
| 17903 ||  || — || March 19, 1999 || Socorro || LINEAR || — || align=right | 5.4 km || 
|-id=904 bgcolor=#fefefe
| 17904 Annekoupal ||  ||  || March 19, 1999 || Socorro || LINEAR || FLO || align=right | 2.6 km || 
|-id=905 bgcolor=#fefefe
| 17905 Kabtamu ||  ||  || March 19, 1999 || Socorro || LINEAR || NYS || align=right | 2.0 km || 
|-id=906 bgcolor=#fefefe
| 17906 ||  || — || March 19, 1999 || Socorro || LINEAR || — || align=right | 7.5 km || 
|-id=907 bgcolor=#E9E9E9
| 17907 Danielgude ||  ||  || March 19, 1999 || Socorro || LINEAR || — || align=right | 3.4 km || 
|-id=908 bgcolor=#fefefe
| 17908 Chriskuyu ||  ||  || March 19, 1999 || Socorro || LINEAR || — || align=right | 2.0 km || 
|-id=909 bgcolor=#E9E9E9
| 17909 Nikhilshukla ||  ||  || March 19, 1999 || Socorro || LINEAR || GEF || align=right | 3.8 km || 
|-id=910 bgcolor=#E9E9E9
| 17910 Munyan ||  ||  || March 20, 1999 || Socorro || LINEAR || — || align=right | 6.5 km || 
|-id=911 bgcolor=#fefefe
| 17911 ||  || — || March 20, 1999 || Socorro || LINEAR || — || align=right | 1.8 km || 
|-id=912 bgcolor=#fefefe
| 17912 ||  || — || March 20, 1999 || Socorro || LINEAR || — || align=right | 3.8 km || 
|-id=913 bgcolor=#fefefe
| 17913 ||  || — || March 20, 1999 || Socorro || LINEAR || — || align=right | 3.0 km || 
|-id=914 bgcolor=#fefefe
| 17914 Joannelee ||  ||  || March 20, 1999 || Socorro || LINEAR || — || align=right | 2.5 km || 
|-id=915 bgcolor=#fefefe
| 17915 || 1999 GU || — || April 5, 1999 || Višnjan Observatory || K. Korlević || — || align=right | 2.0 km || 
|-id=916 bgcolor=#fefefe
| 17916 ||  || — || April 10, 1999 || Woomera || F. B. Zoltowski || FLO || align=right | 1.8 km || 
|-id=917 bgcolor=#E9E9E9
| 17917 Cartan ||  ||  || April 15, 1999 || Prescott || P. G. Comba || — || align=right | 3.8 km || 
|-id=918 bgcolor=#d6d6d6
| 17918 ||  || — || April 14, 1999 || Nachi-Katsuura || Y. Shimizu, T. Urata || — || align=right | 12 km || 
|-id=919 bgcolor=#fefefe
| 17919 Licandro ||  ||  || April 9, 1999 || Anderson Mesa || LONEOS || — || align=right | 3.0 km || 
|-id=920 bgcolor=#fefefe
| 17920 Zarnecki ||  ||  || April 10, 1999 || Anderson Mesa || LONEOS || V || align=right | 2.2 km || 
|-id=921 bgcolor=#fefefe
| 17921 Aldeobaldia ||  ||  || April 15, 1999 || Socorro || LINEAR || V || align=right | 2.8 km || 
|-id=922 bgcolor=#fefefe
| 17922 ||  || — || April 12, 1999 || Kitt Peak || Spacewatch || — || align=right | 4.2 km || 
|-id=923 bgcolor=#fefefe
| 17923 ||  || — || April 15, 1999 || Socorro || LINEAR || V || align=right | 3.6 km || 
|-id=924 bgcolor=#fefefe
| 17924 ||  || — || April 15, 1999 || Socorro || LINEAR || — || align=right | 4.3 km || 
|-id=925 bgcolor=#fefefe
| 17925 Dougweinberg ||  ||  || April 15, 1999 || Socorro || LINEAR || NYS || align=right | 2.9 km || 
|-id=926 bgcolor=#fefefe
| 17926 Jameswu ||  ||  || April 15, 1999 || Socorro || LINEAR || — || align=right | 3.3 km || 
|-id=927 bgcolor=#fefefe
| 17927 Ghoshal ||  ||  || April 15, 1999 || Socorro || LINEAR || — || align=right | 2.2 km || 
|-id=928 bgcolor=#fefefe
| 17928 Neuwirth ||  ||  || April 15, 1999 || Socorro || LINEAR || V || align=right | 4.3 km || 
|-id=929 bgcolor=#E9E9E9
| 17929 ||  || — || April 15, 1999 || Socorro || LINEAR || MAR || align=right | 5.4 km || 
|-id=930 bgcolor=#fefefe
| 17930 Kennethott ||  ||  || April 6, 1999 || Socorro || LINEAR || — || align=right | 3.2 km || 
|-id=931 bgcolor=#d6d6d6
| 17931 ||  || — || April 7, 1999 || Socorro || LINEAR || THM || align=right | 8.4 km || 
|-id=932 bgcolor=#fefefe
| 17932 Viswanathan ||  ||  || April 6, 1999 || Socorro || LINEAR || — || align=right | 3.2 km || 
|-id=933 bgcolor=#fefefe
| 17933 Haraguchi ||  ||  || April 12, 1999 || Socorro || LINEAR || FLO || align=right | 2.1 km || 
|-id=934 bgcolor=#fefefe
| 17934 Deleon ||  ||  || April 12, 1999 || Socorro || LINEAR || V || align=right | 2.5 km || 
|-id=935 bgcolor=#E9E9E9
| 17935 Vinhoward ||  ||  || April 12, 1999 || Socorro || LINEAR || — || align=right | 2.9 km || 
|-id=936 bgcolor=#fefefe
| 17936 Nilus ||  ||  || April 24, 1999 || Reedy Creek || J. Broughton || — || align=right | 2.8 km || 
|-id=937 bgcolor=#E9E9E9
| 17937 ||  || — || April 16, 1999 || Kitt Peak || Spacewatch || — || align=right | 7.1 km || 
|-id=938 bgcolor=#fefefe
| 17938 Tamsendrew ||  ||  || April 17, 1999 || Socorro || LINEAR || — || align=right | 3.2 km || 
|-id=939 bgcolor=#fefefe
| 17939 ||  || — || April 16, 1999 || Socorro || LINEAR || — || align=right | 5.1 km || 
|-id=940 bgcolor=#fefefe
| 17940 Kandyjarvis ||  ||  || May 8, 1999 || Catalina || CSS || FLO || align=right | 1.8 km || 
|-id=941 bgcolor=#fefefe
| 17941 Horbatt ||  ||  || May 6, 1999 || Goodricke-Pigott || R. A. Tucker || — || align=right | 3.3 km || 
|-id=942 bgcolor=#fefefe
| 17942 Whiterabbit ||  ||  || May 11, 1999 || Nachi-Katsuura || Y. Shimizu, T. Urata || FLO || align=right | 2.8 km || 
|-id=943 bgcolor=#fefefe
| 17943 ||  || — || May 8, 1999 || Catalina || CSS || V || align=right | 2.2 km || 
|-id=944 bgcolor=#E9E9E9
| 17944 ||  || — || May 8, 1999 || Catalina || CSS || — || align=right | 7.7 km || 
|-id=945 bgcolor=#E9E9E9
| 17945 Hawass ||  ||  || May 14, 1999 || Reedy Creek || J. Broughton || — || align=right | 4.7 km || 
|-id=946 bgcolor=#fefefe
| 17946 ||  || — || May 7, 1999 || Catalina || CSS || V || align=right | 2.5 km || 
|-id=947 bgcolor=#E9E9E9
| 17947 ||  || — || May 9, 1999 || Catalina || CSS || — || align=right | 3.4 km || 
|-id=948 bgcolor=#fefefe
| 17948 ||  || — || May 12, 1999 || Nanyo || T. Okuni || — || align=right | 3.1 km || 
|-id=949 bgcolor=#E9E9E9
| 17949 ||  || — || May 10, 1999 || Socorro || LINEAR || EUN || align=right | 5.2 km || 
|-id=950 bgcolor=#fefefe
| 17950 Grover ||  ||  || May 10, 1999 || Socorro || LINEAR || — || align=right | 3.3 km || 
|-id=951 bgcolor=#fefefe
| 17951 Fenska ||  ||  || May 10, 1999 || Socorro || LINEAR || — || align=right | 3.4 km || 
|-id=952 bgcolor=#fefefe
| 17952 Folsom ||  ||  || May 10, 1999 || Socorro || LINEAR || V || align=right | 1.8 km || 
|-id=953 bgcolor=#d6d6d6
| 17953 ||  || — || May 10, 1999 || Socorro || LINEAR || — || align=right | 7.3 km || 
|-id=954 bgcolor=#fefefe
| 17954 Hopkins ||  ||  || May 10, 1999 || Socorro || LINEAR || — || align=right | 2.8 km || 
|-id=955 bgcolor=#E9E9E9
| 17955 Sedransk ||  ||  || May 10, 1999 || Socorro || LINEAR || — || align=right | 4.2 km || 
|-id=956 bgcolor=#fefefe
| 17956 Andrewlenoir ||  ||  || May 10, 1999 || Socorro || LINEAR || — || align=right | 2.2 km || 
|-id=957 bgcolor=#fefefe
| 17957 ||  || — || May 10, 1999 || Socorro || LINEAR || — || align=right | 3.2 km || 
|-id=958 bgcolor=#fefefe
| 17958 Schoof ||  ||  || May 10, 1999 || Socorro || LINEAR || — || align=right | 2.2 km || 
|-id=959 bgcolor=#E9E9E9
| 17959 Camierickson ||  ||  || May 10, 1999 || Socorro || LINEAR || NEM || align=right | 7.9 km || 
|-id=960 bgcolor=#fefefe
| 17960 Liberatore ||  ||  || May 10, 1999 || Socorro || LINEAR || NYS || align=right | 3.9 km || 
|-id=961 bgcolor=#fefefe
| 17961 Mariagorodnitsky ||  ||  || May 10, 1999 || Socorro || LINEAR || V || align=right | 2.9 km || 
|-id=962 bgcolor=#fefefe
| 17962 Andrewherron ||  ||  || May 10, 1999 || Socorro || LINEAR || FLO || align=right | 3.1 km || 
|-id=963 bgcolor=#fefefe
| 17963 Vonderheydt ||  ||  || May 10, 1999 || Socorro || LINEAR || — || align=right | 6.3 km || 
|-id=964 bgcolor=#fefefe
| 17964 ||  || — || May 10, 1999 || Socorro || LINEAR || FLO || align=right | 3.9 km || 
|-id=965 bgcolor=#E9E9E9
| 17965 Brodersen ||  ||  || May 10, 1999 || Socorro || LINEAR || — || align=right | 4.4 km || 
|-id=966 bgcolor=#fefefe
| 17966 ||  || — || May 10, 1999 || Socorro || LINEAR || FLO || align=right | 5.1 km || 
|-id=967 bgcolor=#fefefe
| 17967 Bacampbell ||  ||  || May 10, 1999 || Socorro || LINEAR || — || align=right | 3.0 km || 
|-id=968 bgcolor=#d6d6d6
| 17968 ||  || — || May 10, 1999 || Socorro || LINEAR || — || align=right | 10 km || 
|-id=969 bgcolor=#E9E9E9
| 17969 Truong ||  ||  || May 10, 1999 || Socorro || LINEAR || — || align=right | 2.9 km || 
|-id=970 bgcolor=#fefefe
| 17970 Palepu ||  ||  || May 10, 1999 || Socorro || LINEAR || FLO || align=right | 3.0 km || 
|-id=971 bgcolor=#fefefe
| 17971 Samuelhowell ||  ||  || May 10, 1999 || Socorro || LINEAR || NYS || align=right | 3.4 km || 
|-id=972 bgcolor=#E9E9E9
| 17972 Ascione ||  ||  || May 10, 1999 || Socorro || LINEAR || PAD || align=right | 5.4 km || 
|-id=973 bgcolor=#E9E9E9
| 17973 ||  || — || May 10, 1999 || Socorro || LINEAR || — || align=right | 23 km || 
|-id=974 bgcolor=#fefefe
| 17974 ||  || — || May 10, 1999 || Socorro || LINEAR || FLO || align=right | 4.0 km || 
|-id=975 bgcolor=#E9E9E9
| 17975 ||  || — || May 10, 1999 || Socorro || LINEAR || RAF || align=right | 4.0 km || 
|-id=976 bgcolor=#fefefe
| 17976 Schulman ||  ||  || May 10, 1999 || Socorro || LINEAR || V || align=right | 2.9 km || 
|-id=977 bgcolor=#E9E9E9
| 17977 ||  || — || May 10, 1999 || Socorro || LINEAR || — || align=right | 6.1 km || 
|-id=978 bgcolor=#fefefe
| 17978 ||  || — || May 10, 1999 || Socorro || LINEAR || — || align=right | 3.2 km || 
|-id=979 bgcolor=#E9E9E9
| 17979 ||  || — || May 10, 1999 || Socorro || LINEAR || GEF || align=right | 5.9 km || 
|-id=980 bgcolor=#d6d6d6
| 17980 Vanschaik ||  ||  || May 10, 1999 || Socorro || LINEAR || KOR || align=right | 5.2 km || 
|-id=981 bgcolor=#d6d6d6
| 17981 ||  || — || May 10, 1999 || Socorro || LINEAR || — || align=right | 10 km || 
|-id=982 bgcolor=#fefefe
| 17982 Simcmillan ||  ||  || May 10, 1999 || Socorro || LINEAR || FLO || align=right | 2.8 km || 
|-id=983 bgcolor=#fefefe
| 17983 Buhrmester ||  ||  || May 10, 1999 || Socorro || LINEAR || NYS || align=right | 6.3 km || 
|-id=984 bgcolor=#E9E9E9
| 17984 Ahantonioli ||  ||  || May 10, 1999 || Socorro || LINEAR || — || align=right | 5.9 km || 
|-id=985 bgcolor=#fefefe
| 17985 ||  || — || May 10, 1999 || Socorro || LINEAR || — || align=right | 4.5 km || 
|-id=986 bgcolor=#E9E9E9
| 17986 ||  || — || May 10, 1999 || Socorro || LINEAR || — || align=right | 5.5 km || 
|-id=987 bgcolor=#d6d6d6
| 17987 ||  || — || May 10, 1999 || Socorro || LINEAR || EOS || align=right | 5.6 km || 
|-id=988 bgcolor=#fefefe
| 17988 Joannehsieh ||  ||  || May 10, 1999 || Socorro || LINEAR || V || align=right | 2.4 km || 
|-id=989 bgcolor=#E9E9E9
| 17989 ||  || — || May 10, 1999 || Socorro || LINEAR || DOR || align=right | 13 km || 
|-id=990 bgcolor=#E9E9E9
| 17990 ||  || — || May 10, 1999 || Socorro || LINEAR || — || align=right | 10 km || 
|-id=991 bgcolor=#fefefe
| 17991 Joshuaegan ||  ||  || May 12, 1999 || Socorro || LINEAR || — || align=right | 2.8 km || 
|-id=992 bgcolor=#fefefe
| 17992 Japellegrino ||  ||  || May 12, 1999 || Socorro || LINEAR || V || align=right | 2.0 km || 
|-id=993 bgcolor=#fefefe
| 17993 Kluesing ||  ||  || May 12, 1999 || Socorro || LINEAR || — || align=right | 2.4 km || 
|-id=994 bgcolor=#d6d6d6
| 17994 ||  || — || May 12, 1999 || Socorro || LINEAR || SAN || align=right | 11 km || 
|-id=995 bgcolor=#fefefe
| 17995 Jolinefan ||  ||  || May 12, 1999 || Socorro || LINEAR || V || align=right | 2.6 km || 
|-id=996 bgcolor=#fefefe
| 17996 ||  || — || May 10, 1999 || Socorro || LINEAR || — || align=right | 4.3 km || 
|-id=997 bgcolor=#fefefe
| 17997 ||  || — || May 13, 1999 || Socorro || LINEAR || — || align=right | 6.8 km || 
|-id=998 bgcolor=#d6d6d6
| 17998 ||  || — || May 12, 1999 || Socorro || LINEAR || — || align=right | 7.4 km || 
|-id=999 bgcolor=#E9E9E9
| 17999 ||  || — || May 12, 1999 || Socorro || LINEAR || — || align=right | 3.8 km || 
|-id=000 bgcolor=#E9E9E9
| 18000 ||  || — || May 12, 1999 || Socorro || LINEAR || — || align=right | 4.3 km || 
|}

References

External links 
 Discovery Circumstances: Numbered Minor Planets (15001)–(20000) (IAU Minor Planet Center)

0017